= History of ancient numeral systems =

Numeral systems have progressed from the use of fingers and tally marks, perhaps more than 40,000 years ago, to the use of sets of glyphs able to represent any conceivable number efficiently. The earliest known clear notations for numbers emerged in Mesopotamia about 5000 or 6000 years ago.

== Prehistory ==
The earliest form of counting involves the use of fingers, a practice termed finger-counting. This technique remains a common practice in modern times, and is mimicked by tally marks and the use of hands to express numbers five and ten. In addition, the majority of the world's number systems are organized by tens, fives, and twenties, suggesting the use of the hands and feet in counting; cross-linguistically, terms for these amounts are etymologically based on the hands and feet. Finally, there are neurological connections between the parts of the brain that appreciate quantity and the part that "knows" the fingers (finger gnosia), and these suggest that humans are neurologically predisposed to use their hands in counting. While finger-counting is typically not preserved in archaeological evidence, some prehistoric hand stencils have been interpreted as finger-counting; out of the 32 possible patterns the fingers can produce, only five (the ones typically used in counting from one to five) are found at Cosquer Cave, France.

Since the capacity and persistence of the fingers are limited, finger-counting is typically supplemented by means of devices with greater capacity and persistence, including tallies made of wood or other materials. Possible tally marks made by carving notches in wood, bone, and stone appear in the archaeological record at least forty thousand years ago. These tally marks may have been used for counting time, such as numbers of days or lunar cycles, or for keeping records of quantities, such as numbers of animals or other valuable commodities. However, there is currently no diagnostic technique that can reliably determine the social purpose or use of prehistoric linear marks inscribed on surfaces, and contemporary ethnographic examples show that similar artifacts are made and used for non-numerical purposes.

The Lebombo bone is a baboon fibula with incised markings discovered in the Lebombo Mountains located between South Africa and Eswatini. The bone has been dated to 42,000 years ago. According to The Universal Book of Mathematics, the Lebombo bone's 29 notches suggest that "it may have been used as a lunar phase counter, in which case African women may have been the first mathematicians, because keeping track of menstrual cycles requires a lunar calendar." However, the bone is clearly broken at one end, so the 29 notches might only represent a portion of a larger sequence. Similar artifacts from contemporary societies, like those of Australia, also suggest that such notches can serve mnemonic or conventional functions, rather than meaning numbers.

The Ishango bone is an artifact with a sharp piece of quartz affixed to one end, perhaps for engraving. It has been dated to 25,000 years ago. The artifact was first thought to be a tally stick, as it has a series of what has been interpreted as tally marks carved in three rows running the length of the tool. The first row has been interpreted as the prime numbers between 10 and 20 (i.e., 19, 17, 13, and 11), while a second row appears to add and subtract 1 from 10 and 20 (i.e., 9, 19, 21, and 11); the third row contains amounts that might be halves and doubles, though these are inconsistent. Noting the statistical probability of producing such numbers by accident, researchers like Jean de Heinzelin have suggested that the notch groupings indicate a mathematical understanding far beyond simple counting. It has also been suggested that the marks might have been made for a utilitarian purpose, like creating a better grip for the handle, or for some other non-mathematical reason. The purpose and meaning of the notches continue to be debated in academic literature.

== Clay tokens ==
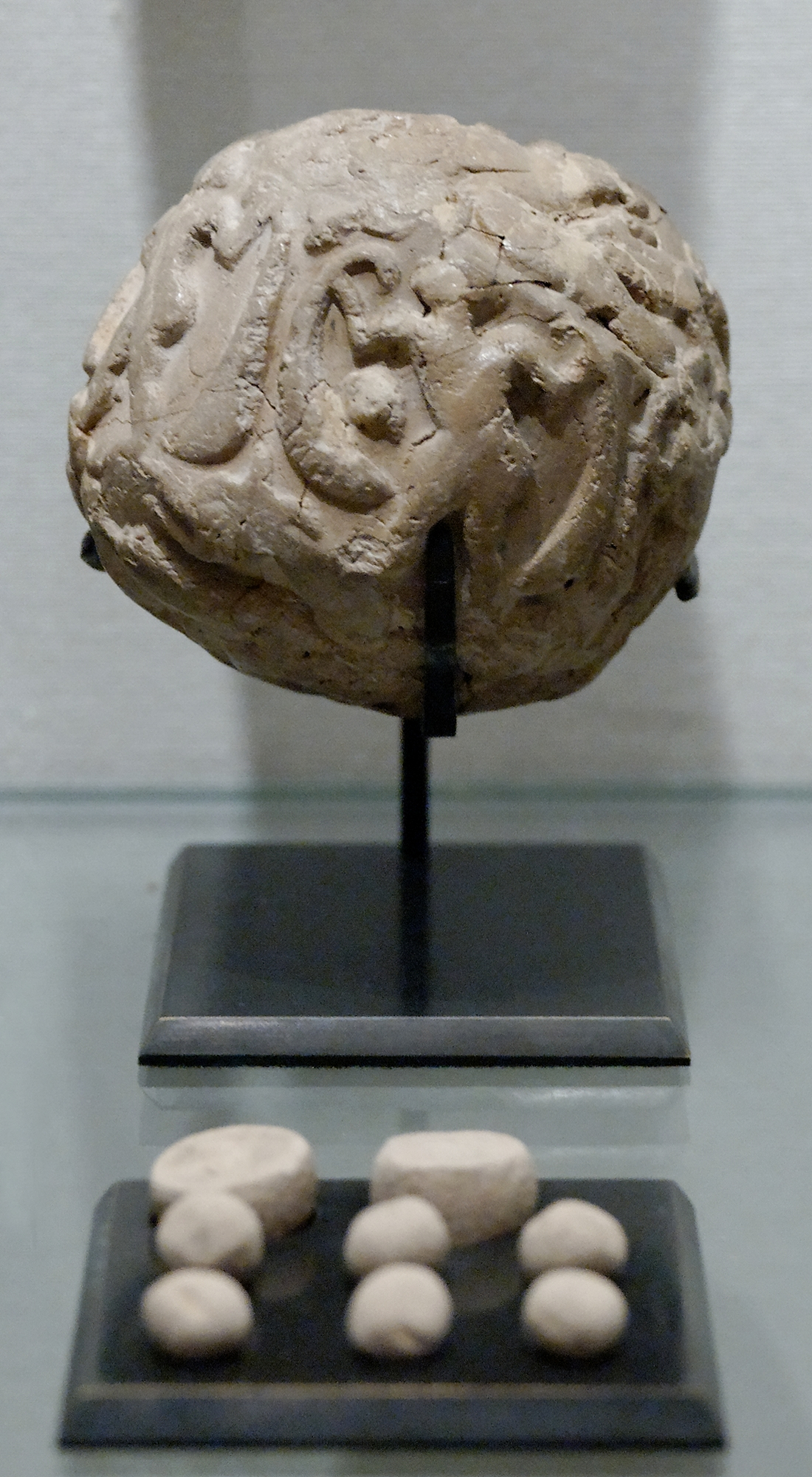
Uruk period: globular envelope with a cluster of accountancy tokens, from Susa. Louvre Museum

The earliest known writing for record keeping emerged from a system of accounting that used small clay tokens. The earliest artifacts claimed to be tokens are from Tell Abu Hureyra, a site in the Upper Euphrates valley in Syria dated to the 10th millennium BCE, and Ganj-i-Dareh Tepe, a site in the Zagros region of Iran dated to the 9th millennium BCE.

To create a record that represented "two sheep", two tokens each representing one unit were used. Different types of objects were also counted differently. Within the counting system used with most discrete objects (including animals like sheep), there was a token for one item (units), a different token for ten items (tens), a different token for six tens (sixties), etc. Tokens of different sizes and shapes were used to record higher groups of ten or six in a sexagesimal number system. Different combinations of token shapes and sizes encoded the different counting systems. Archaeologist Denise Schmandt-Besserat has argued that the plain geometric tokens used for numbers were accompanied by complex tokens that identified the commodities being enumerated. For ungulates like sheep, this complex token was a flat disk marked with a quartered circle. However, the purported use of complex tokens has also been criticized on a number of grounds.

=== Use with bullae and numerical impressions ===
To ensure that tokens were not lost or altered in their type or quantity, they were placed into clay envelopes shaped like hollow balls known as bullae (a bulla). Ownership and witness seals were impressed on bullae surfaces, which might also be left plain. If tokens needed to be verified after the bulla containing them was sealed, the bulla had to be broken open. Around the mid-fourth millennium BCE, tokens began being pressed into a bulla's outer surface before being sealed inside, presumably to avoid the need to break open the bulla to see them. This process created external impressions on bullae surfaces that corresponded to the enclosed tokens in their sizes, shapes, and quantities. Eventually, the redundancy created by the tokens inside and impressions outside a bulla seems to have been recognized, and impressions on flat tablets became the preferred method of recording numerical information. The correspondences between impressions and tokens, and the chronology of forms they comprised, were initially noticed and published by scholars like Piere Amiet.

By the time that the numerical impressions provided insight into ancient numbers, the Sumerians had already developed a complex arithmetic. Computations were likely performed either with tokens or by means of an abacus or counting board.

== Numerical signs and numerals ==
=== Proto-cuneiform ===
In the mid-to-late-fourth millennium BCE, numerical impressions used with bullae were replaced by numerical tablets bearing proto-cuneiform numerals impressed into clay with a round stylus held at different angles to produce the various shapes used for numerical signs. As was true of tokens and the numerical impressions on the outside of bullae, each numerical sign represented both the commodity being counted and the quantity or volume of that commodity. These numerals were soon accompanied by small pictures that identified the commodity being enumerated. The Sumerians counted different types of objects differently. As understood through analyses of early proto-cuneiform notations from the city of Uruk, there were more than a dozen different counting systems, including a general system for counting most discrete objects (such as animals, tools, and people) and specialized systems for counting cheese and grain products, volumes of grain (including fractional units), land areas, and time. Object-specified counting is not unusual and has been documented for contemporary peoples around the world; such modern systems provide good insight into how the ancient Sumerian number systems likely functioned.

=== Cuneiform ===
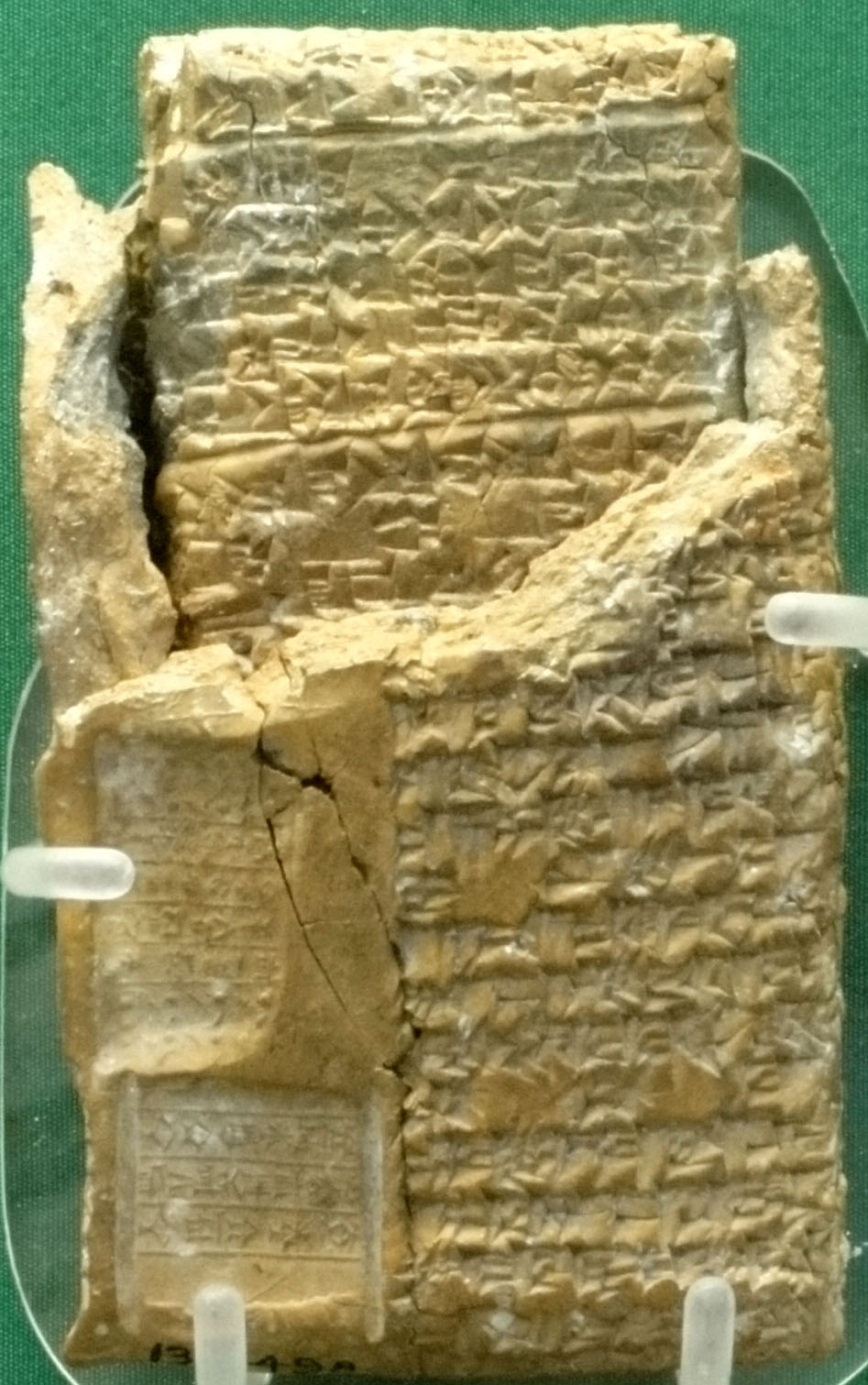
Middle Babylonian legal tablet from Alalakh in its envelope

Around 2700 BCE, the round stylus began to be replaced by a reed stylus that produced the wedge-shaped impressions that give cuneiform signs their name. As was the case with the tokens, numerical impressions, and proto-cuneiform numerals, cuneiform numerals are today sometimes ambiguous in the numerical values they represent. This ambiguity is partly because the base unit of an object-specified counting system is not always understood, and partly because the Sumerian number system lacked a convention like a decimal point to differentiate integers from fractions or higher exponents from lower ones. About 2100 BCE, a common sexagesimal number system with place-value developed and was used to aid conversions between object-specified counting systems. A decimal version of the sexagesimal number system, today called Assyro-Babylonian Common, developed in the second millennium BCE, reflecting the increased influence of Semitic peoples like the Akkadians and Eblaites; while today it is less well known than its sexagesimal counterpart, it would eventually become the dominant system used throughout the region, especially as Sumerian cultural influence began to wane.

Sexagesimal numerals were a mixed radix system that retained the alternating bases of 10 and 6 that characterized tokens, numerical impressions, and proto-cuneiform numerical signs. Sexagesimal numerals were used in commerce, as well as for astronomical and other calculations. In Arabic numerals, sexagesimal is still used today to count time (second per minute; minutes per hour), and angles (degrees).

== Roman numerals ==
The Roman numerals developed from Etruscan symbols around the middle of the 1st millennium BCE. In the Etruscan system, the symbol 1 was a single vertical mark, the symbol 10 was two perpendicularly crossed tally marks, and the symbol 100 was three crossed tally marks (similar in form to a modern asterisk *); while 5 (an inverted V shape) and 50 (an inverted V split by a single vertical mark) were perhaps derived from the lower halves of the signs for 10 and 100, there is no convincing explanation as to how the Roman symbol for 100, C, was derived from its asterisk-shaped Etruscan antecedent.

== See also ==
- Alphabetic numeral system – Type of numeral system
- Counting rods – Small bars used for calculating in ancient East Asia
- Cuneiform Numbers and Punctuation
- History of arithmetic – Branch of elementary mathematics
- History of mathematics
- History of numbers – Used to count, measure, and label
- History of the Hindu–Arabic numeral system
- History of writing
- Jeton – Coin-like counting token
- List of numeral system topics
- List of numeral systems
- Relationship between mathematics and physics – Relationship between fields of study
- Number theory – Branch of pure mathematics
- Timeline of mathematics
- Timeline of numerals and arithmetic
- List of books on history of number systems

== Bibliography ==
- Amiet, Pierre (1966). "Il y a 5000 Ans Les Élamites Inventaient l'écriture". Archéologia. 12: 6–23.
- Amiet, Pierre (1972a). Mémoires de la délégation archéologique en Iran, Tome XLIII, Mission de Susiane. Glyptique Susienne des origines à l'époque des perses achéménides. Cachets, sceaux-cylindres et empreintes antiques découverts à Suse de 1913 à 1967. Vol. I – Texte. Mémoires de La Délégation En Perse (MDP) 43. Paris: Librairie Orientaliste Paul Geuthner. OCLC 310593689.
- Amiet, Pierre (1972b). Mémoires de la délégation archéologique en Iran, Tome XLIII, Mission de Susiane. Glyptique Susienne des origines à l'époque des perses achéménides. Cachets, sceaux-cylindres et empreintes antiques découverts à Suse de 1913 à 1967. Vol. II – Planches. Mémoires de La Délégation En Perse (MDP) 43. Paris: Librairie Orientaliste Paul Geuthner. OCLC 310593694.
- Amiet, Pierre (1987). "Approche physique de la comptabilité à l'Époque d'Uruk: Les bulles-enveloppes de Suse". In Huot, Jean-Louis (ed.). Préhistoire de la Mésopotamie: La Mésopotamie préhistorique et l'exploration récente du Djebel Hamrin. Paris: Éditions du Centre National de la Recherche Scientifique. pp. 331–334. ISBN 9782222038542.
- Brooks, Alison S.; Smith, Catherine C. (1987). "Ishango revisited: New age determinations and cultural interpretations". African Archaeological Review. 5 (1): 65–78. doi:10.1007/BF01117083. S2CID 129091602.
- Chrisomalis, Stephen (2010). Numerical notation: A comparative history. Cambridge: Cambridge University Press. ISBN 9780511683305.
- Epps, Patience (2006). "Growing a numeral system: The historical development of numerals in an Amazonian language family". Diachronica. 23 (2): 259–288. doi:10.1075/dia.23.2.03epp.
- D'Errico, Francesco; Backwell, Lucinda; Villa, Paola; Degano, Ilaria; Lucejko, Jeanette J.; Bamford, Marion K.; Higham, Thomas F. G.; Colombini, Maria Perla; Beaumont, Peter B. (2012). "Early evidence of San material culture represented by organic artifacts from Border Cave, South Africa". Proceedings of the National Academy of Sciences of the United States of America. 109 (33): 13214–13219. Bibcode:2012PNAS..10913214D. doi:10.1073/pnas.1204213109. PMC 3421171. PMID 22847420.
- De Heinzelin, Jean (1962). "Ishango". Scientific American. 206 (6): 105–116. Bibcode:1962SciAm.206f.105D. doi:10.1038/scientificamerican0662-105.
- Dehaene, Stanislas (2011). The number sense: How the mind creates mathematics. Oxford: Oxford University Press. ISBN 9780199753871.
- Epps, Patience; Bowern, Claire; Hansen, Cynthia A.; Hill, Jane H.; Zentz, Jason (2012). "On numeral complexity in hunter-gatherer languages". Linguistic Typology. 16 (1): 41–109. doi:10.1515/lity-2012-0002. hdl:1885/61320. S2CID 120776759.
- Høyrup, Jens (2002). "A note on Old Babylonian computational techniques". Historia Mathematica. 29 (2): 193–198. doi:10.1006/hmat.2002.2343.
- Ifrah, Georges (2000) [1981]. The universal history of numbers: From prehistory to the invention of the computer. New York: John Wiley & Sons. ISBN 0-471-37568-3.
- Kelly, Piers (2020). "Australian message sticks: Old questions, new directions". Journal of Material Culture. 25 (2): 133–152. doi:10.1177/1359183519858375. hdl:21.11116/0000-0003-FDF8-9. S2CID 198687425.
- Keyser, Paul (1988). "The origin of the Latin numerals 1 to 1000". American Journal of Archaeology. 92 (4): 529–546. doi:10.2307/505248. JSTOR 505248. S2CID 193086234.
- Marshack, Alexander (1972). The Roots of Civilization: The cognitive beginnings of man's first art, symbol and notation. New York: McGraw Hill. ISBN 9781559210416.
- Moore, Andrew; Tangye, Michael (2000). "Stone and other artifacts". In Moore, Andrew; Tangye, Michael; Hillman, Gordon C; Legge, Anthony J (eds.). Village on the Euphrates: From foraging to farming at Abu Hureyra. Oxford: Oxford University Press. pp. 165–186. ISBN 9780195108071.
- Nissen, Hans J.; Damerow, Peter; Englund, Robert K. (1993). Archaic bookkeeping: Early writing and techniques of economic administration in the ancient Near East. Chicago, IL: University of Chicago Press. ISBN 0-226-58659-6. OCLC 469457678.
- Overmann, Karenleigh A. (2018). "Constructing a concept of number". Journal of Numerical Cognition. 4 (2): 464–493. doi:10.5964/jnc.v4i2.161. hdl:20.500.12034/1301. S2CID 52197209.
- Overmann, Karenleigh A. (2021a). "A New Look at Old Numbers, and What It Reveals about Numeration". Journal of Near Eastern Studies. 80 (2): 291–321. doi:10.1086/715767. S2CID 239028709.
- Overmann, Karenleigh A. (2021b). "Finger-counting and numerical structure". Frontiers in Psychology. 12 723492. doi:10.3389/fpsyg.2021.723492. PMC 8506119. PMID 34650482.
- Penner-Wilger, Marcie; Fast, Lisa; LeFevre, Jo-Anne; Smith-Chant, Brenda L; Skwarchuk, Sheri-Lynn; Kamawar, Deepthi; Bisanz, Jeffrey (2007). "The foundations of numeracy: Subitizing, finger gnosia, and fine motor ability". In McNamara, D. S.; Trafton, J. G. (eds.). Proceedings of the Twenty-Ninth Annual Meeting of the Cognitive Science Society. Lawrence Erlbaum Associates. pp. 1385–1390. ISBN 9780976831839.
- Pletser, Vladimir; Huylebrouck, Dirk (2015). "Contradictions et Étroitesse de Vues Dans 'Fables d'Ishango, Ou l'irrésistible Tentation de La Mathématique-Fiction,' Réponses et Mises Au Point". arXiv:1607.00860 [math.HO].
- Robson, Eleanor (2007). "Mesopotamian mathematics". In Katz, Victor (ed.). The mathematics of Egypt, Mesopotamia, China, India, and Islam: A sourcebook. Princeton, NJ: Princeton University Press. ISBN 9780691235394.
- Rouillon, André (2006). "Au Gravettien, Dans La Grotte Cosquer (Marseille, Bouches-Du-Rhône), l'Homme a-t-Il Compté Sur Ses Doigts?". Anthropologie. 110 (4): 500–509. doi:10.1016/j.anthro.2006.07.003.
- Schmandt-Besserat, Denise (1989). "Two precursors of writing: Plain and complex tokens". In Senner, Wayne M. (ed.). The Origins of Writing. University of Nebraska Press. pp. 27–41. ISBN 9780803242029.
- Schmandt-Besserat, Denise (1996). How writing came about. Austin, TX: University of Texas Press. ISBN 0-292-77704-3.
- Thureau-Dangin, François (1939). "Sketch of a history of the sexagesimal system". Osiris. 7: 95–141. doi:10.1086/368503. S2CID 144051854.
- Woods, Christopher (2017). "The abacus in Mesopotamia: Considerations from a comparative perspective". In Feliu, Lluís; Karahashi, Fumi; Rubio, Gonzalo (eds.). The first ninety years: A Sumerian celebration in honor of Miguel Civil. Boston: Walter de Gruyter. pp. 416–478. ISBN 9781501503726.
- Zimansky, Paul (1993). "Review of Denise Schmandt-Besserat's Before Writing, Volumes I and II". Journal of Field Archaeology. 20 (4): 513–517. doi:10.2307/530080. JSTOR 530080.
