= Denise Schmandt-Besserat =

French-American archaeologist (born 1933)

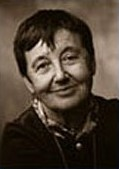
Schmandt-Besserat

Denise Schmandt-Besserat (born August 10, 1933 in Ay, Marne, France) is a French-American archaeologist and retired professor of art and archaeology of the ancient Near East. She spent much of her professional career as a professor at the University of Texas. She is best known for her work on the history and invention of writing. While her research is highly cited, it has been controversial among scholars. The controversies, as detailed below, concern the interpretation of early tokens, particularly the complex ones; however, the idea that writing emerged out of the counting, cataloging, management, and transactions of agricultural produce has been largely accepted.

== Early life and education ==
Denise Besserat was born into a family of lawyers and winemakers. Her early education was at the hands of tutors. Her family evacuated to southern France during World War II, after which she attended a Catholic boarding school at Reims. The school's nuns directed her to a prospective career as a language interpreter, for which she spent periods in Ireland and Germany in language studies. She met her future husband, Jurgen Schmandt (a philosopher and expert in science policy), in Bonn in 1954; they were married in 1956. They lived in Paris, where three sons (Alexander, Christophe, Phillip) were added to the family.

Deciding to resume her studies, she entered the École du Louvre. She graduated in 1965, after which the family moved to Cambridge, Massachusetts, where her husband had been offered employment. She applied for a fellowship at Harvard University's Peabody Museum of Archaeology and Ethnology, to study the origins of the use of clay as a writing material in the Middle East.

She and her family moved to Austin, Texas in 1971, where she began teaching Art History.

== Career ==
Schmandt-Besserat has worked on the origin of writing and counting, and the nature of information management systems in oral societies.

Her first published works on clay tokens were the monograph, "Archaic Recording System and the Origin of Writing," published by Syro-Mesopotamian Studies in 1977 and The Earliest Precursor of Writing in a 1978 issue of Scientific American magazine.

In those articles Schmandt-Besserat explained her methodology and reviewed the history of archeological discoveries of clay counting tokens found at the main sites in Asia. She credited the work done by A. Leo Oppenheim of University of Chicago and Pierre Amiet of the Louvre Museum for their original insights. Oppenheim, she says, "visualized a kind of dual bookkeeping system." Amiet demonstrated that the tokens were in existence far earlier than previously thought, a finding, she says, "of great significance."

Her publications on these subjects include:

- Before Writing (2 vols), University of Texas Press, 1992;
- How Writing Came About, University of Texas Press, 1996;
- The History of Counting, Morrow Jr., 1999 (a children's book);
- When Writing Met Art, University of Texas Press, 2007;
- "The Earliest Precursor of Writing," Scientific American (1978); and
- numerous articles in major scholarly and popular journals, among them Science, Scientific American, Archaeology, American Journal of Archaeology, and Archaeology Odyssey.

Her work has been widely reported in the public media (Scientific American, Science News, Time, Life, New York Times, The Washington Post, Los Angeles Times, Christian Science Monitor). She was featured in several television programs such as Out of the Past (Discovery Channel), Discover (Disney Channel); The Nature of Things (CBC), Search for Solutions (PBS), and Tell the Truth (NBC).

She retired in 2004 as Professor of Art and Middle Eastern Studies at the University of Texas at Austin.

In her most recent book, When Writing Met Art (2007), Schmandt-Besserat investigated the impact of literacy on visual art. She showed that, before writing, art of the ancient Near East mostly consisted of repetitive motifs. But, after writing, conventions of the Mesopotamian script, such as the semantic use of form, size, order and placement of signs on a tablet was applied to images resulting in complex visual narratives. She also shows how, reciprocally, art played a crucial role in the evolution of writing from a mere accounting system to literature when funerary and votive inscriptions started to be featured on art monuments.

Schmandt-Besserat's present interest is the cognitive aspects of the token system that functioned as an extension of the human brain to collect, manipulate, store and retrieve data. She studies how processing an increasing volume of data over thousands of years brought people to think in greater abstraction. However, some of her conclusions have been questioned by later researchers. She also continues her research on Neolithic symbolism at the site of 'Ain Ghazal, near Amman, Jordan.

== Awards and honors ==
Schmandt-Besserat has received the Walter J. Ong Award for Career Achievement; the Holloway teaching award; the Eugene Kayden Press Book Award and the Hamilton book Award. She been cited Outstanding Woman in the Humanities by the American Association of University Women.

Her book, How Writing Came About, was listed by American Scientist as one of the 100 books that shaped science in the 20th century.

She is listed in Who's Who in America.

At the 180th Commencement of Kenyon College she received an honorary degree.

== Criticisms ==
Correspondences between (plain) tokens and numerical impressions suggest that tokens were used as numerical counters in the 4th millennium BC. The possible role of tokens was initially noticed and published by French archaeologists Pierre Amiet and Maurice Lambert and other scholars. In the decades since these publications, the idea has become widely accepted. As noted by the Assyriologist Robert K. Englund in 1998, "a general consensus of opinion in the field tends to support" the argument that the plain tokens were "the precursors of the impressed proto-cuneiform signs used for numerical and metrological notations in the earliest texts to represent numbers and measures of products of a redistributive archaic economy"Although Schmandt-Besserat gave credit to the work of her predecessors in the field, she has often been singled out as the discoverer of these correspondences. William Goetzmann's history of money, Money Changes Everything (Princeton U.P., 2012) is one example.

Schmandt-Besserat's claims about the role of tokens in both numbers and writing, particularly the complex tokens, have been significantly criticized:

- Historically, archaeologists have tended to under-collect and under-document small clay objects possibly used as tokens, so Schmandt-Besserat's catalogue is likely a skewed sample.
- There are no commonly accepted standards for classifying tokens as either numerical or pre-writing, and other potential social purposes are suggested by find contexts (e.g., burial sites and funerary offerings). Thus, an unknown portion of the objects classified by Schmandt-Besserat as "tokens" were unlikely to have been used for counting or record-keeping.
- Her claim that the tokens were used only in one-to-one correspondence has been shown as likely incorrect by statistical analyses and imaging studies that demonstrate Mesopotamian counting as organized in over a dozen specialized sequences with specific numerical relations.
- Her claim that the tokens comprised a coherent system used throughout the Mesopotamian Plain beginning as early as the 9th mil. BC has been countered with observations of their significant variability in shapes, sizes, and quantities.
- Her claim that the complex tokens directly prefigured writing has been criticized on various grounds. For example, there is only minimal correspondence between complex tokens and the pictures used as the first commodity labels. There are also significant discontinuities between the archaeological prevalence of commodities and tokens that would indicate them if Schmandt-Besserat's hypothesis were correct; for example, complex tokens with the quartered circle that meant sheep are rare, yet sheep were a common commodity.
- Her claim that Mesopotamian numbers were particularly concrete is unlikely to be true: “If ... polyvalence and context-dependence imply an absence of abstract number concepts, then paradoxically, the quasi-literate Uruk accountants would be less numerate than the average Sumerian who did not use texts, only number words.” Also, “the accountants and scribes who used [tokens and numbers] were able to manage complex administrative tasks, and it is implausible that they did not recognize that ‘8 sheep’ and ‘8 bushels of grain’ had something in common.”
- Her claim that Neolithic peoples did not recognize quantity shared between sets of physical objects, including tokens used as counters, is “unlikely to have been true, given the innate capacity to appreciate small quantities, which Mesopotamian peoples shared, as well as the ‘bundling relations’ between tokens, which imply the ability to count because quantities like six and ten exceed the range perceptible through the innate ability to appreciate quantity.”

== See also ==
- Bulla (seal)
- History of writing
- History of accounting
- History of ancient numeral systems
- Proto-cuneiform
