= Bulla (seal) =

Device to seal or authenticate documents

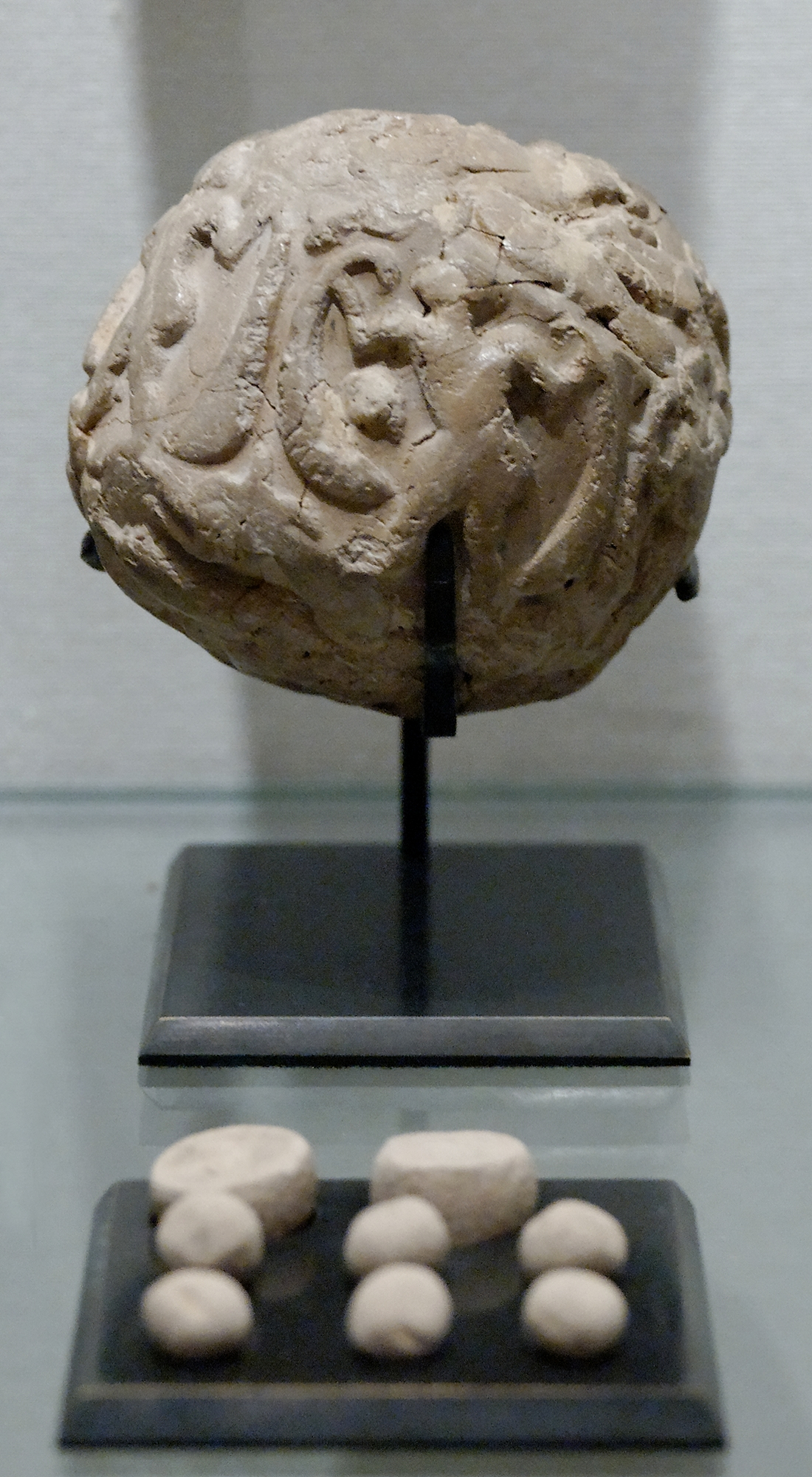
A bulla (or clay envelope) and its contents on display at the Louvre. Uruk period (4000–3100 BC).

A bulla (Medieval Latin for "a round seal", from Classical Latin bulla, "bubble, blob"; plural bullae) is an inscribed clay, soft metal (lead or tin), bitumen, or wax token used in commercial and legal documentation as a form of authentication and for tamper-proofing whatever is attached to it (or, in the historical form, contained in it).

In their oldest attested form, as used in the ancient Near East and the Middle East of the 8th millennium BC onwards, bullae were hollow clay balls that contained other smaller tokens that identified the quantity and types of goods being recorded. In this form, bullae represent one of the earliest forms of specialization in the ancient world, and likely required skill to create. From about the 4th millennium BC onwards, as communications on papyrus and parchment became widespread, bullae evolved into simpler tokens that were attached to the documents with cord, and impressed with a unique sign (i.e., a seal) to provide the same kind of authoritative identification and for tamper-proofing. Bullae are still occasionally attached to documents for these purposes (e.g., the seal on a papal bull).

== Origins ==
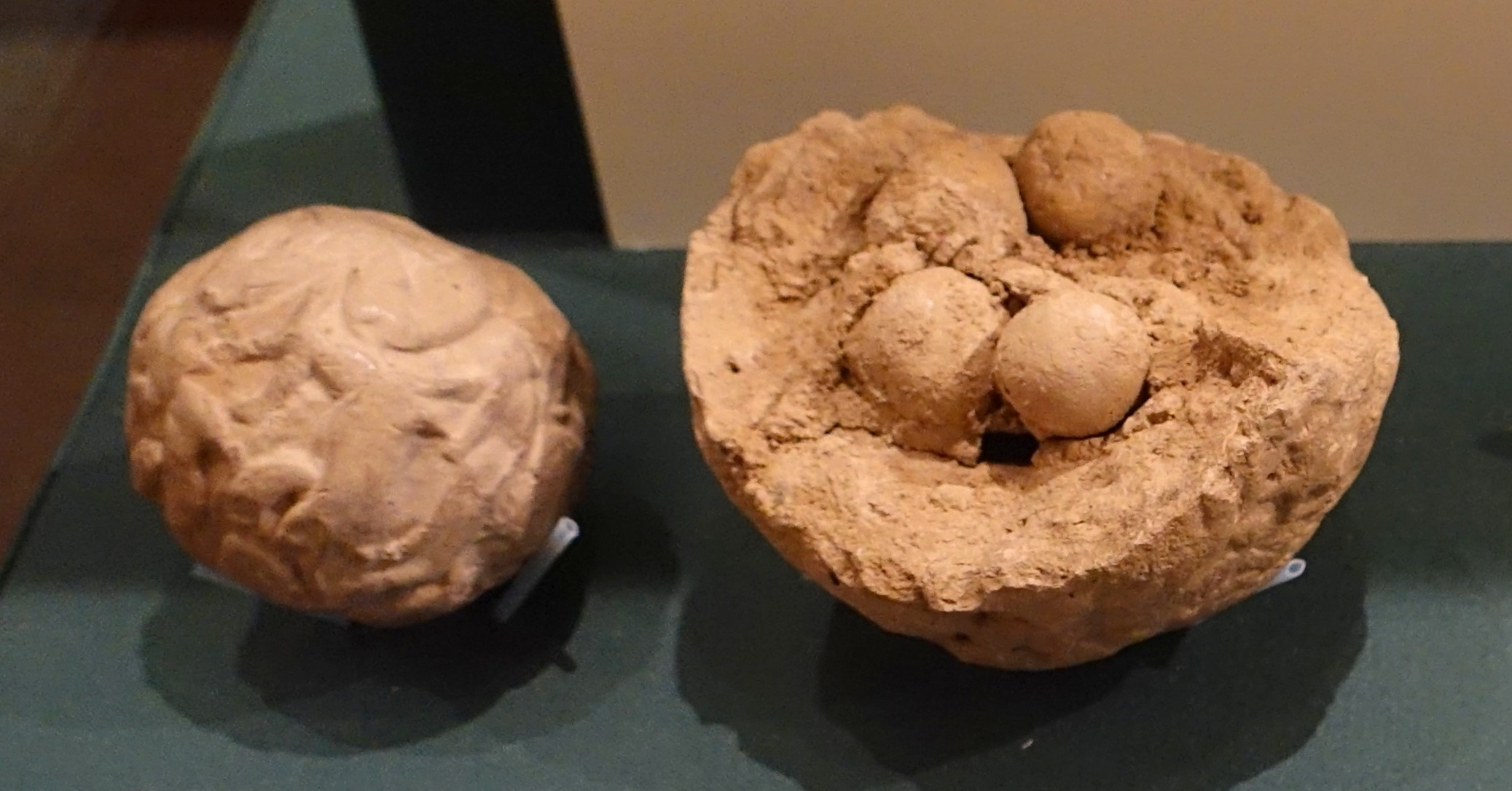
Two clay bullae, one complete and sealed, the other broken with tokens visible, Uruk period. Oriental Institute Museum, Chicago.

During the period 8,000–7,500 BC, the Sumerian agriculturalists needed a way to keep records of their animals and goods. Small clay tokens were formed and shaped by the palms to represent certain animals and goods.

Clay tokens allowed agriculturalists to keep track of animals and food that had been traded, stored, and/or sold. Because grain production became such a major part of life, they needed to store their extra grain in shared facilities and account for their food. This clay token system went unchanged for about 4,000 years until the tokens started to become more elaborate in appearance. The tokens were similar in size, material, and color but the markings had more of a variety of shapes. As the amount of goods being produced increased and the exchanging of goods became more common, changes to tokens were made to keep up with the growth.

Transactions for trading needed to be accounted for efficiently, so the clay tokens were placed in a clay ball (bulla), which helped to prevent deception and kept all the tokens together. In order to account for the tokens, the bullae would have to be broken open to reveal their contents. Seals were impressed into the opening of the bullae to prevent tampering. Each party had its own unique seal to identify them. Seals would not only identify individuals, but it would also identify their office. Sometimes, the token was impressed onto the wet bulla before it dried so that the owner could remember what exactly was in the bulla without having to break it.

== Precursor to writing ==
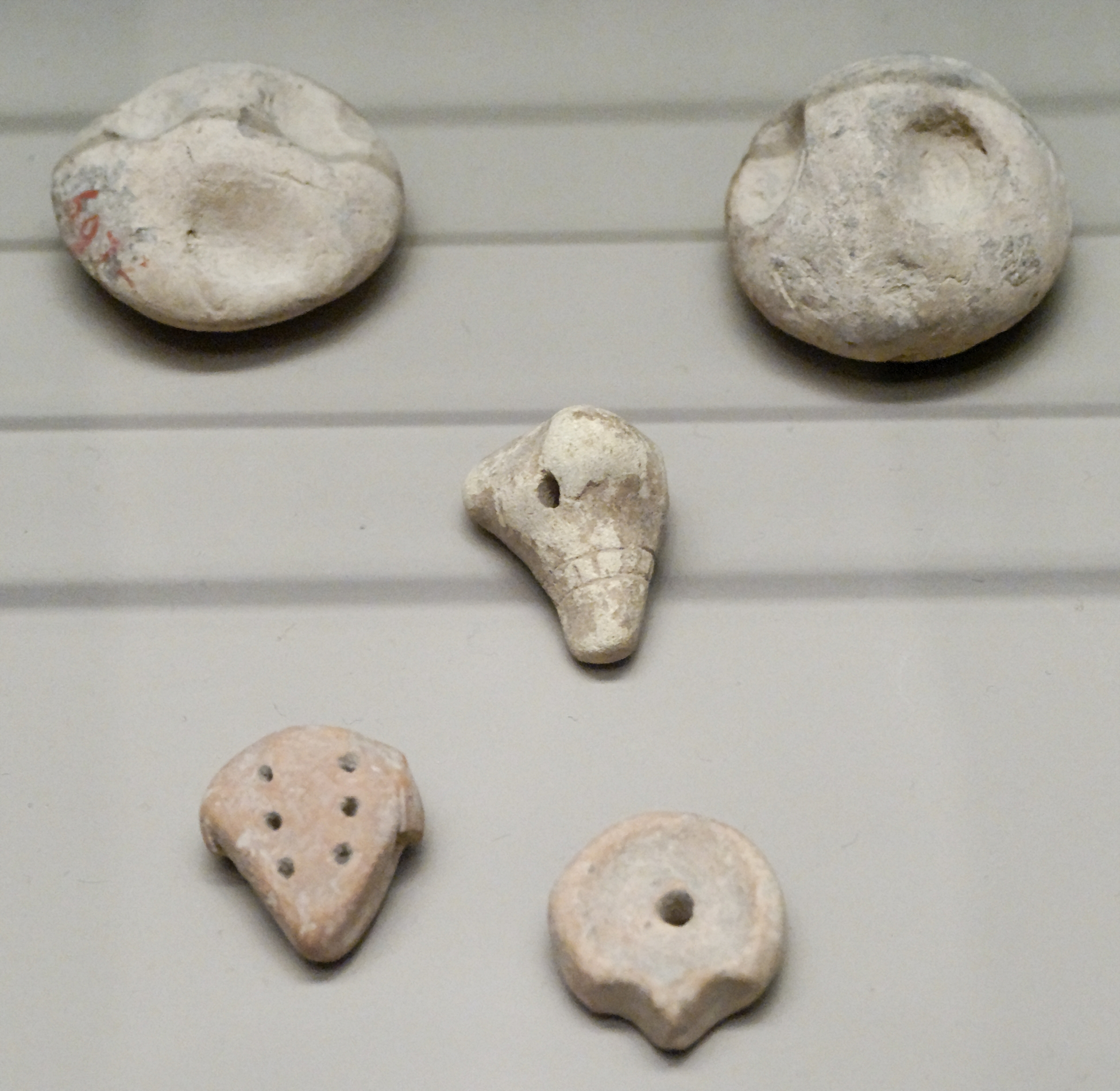
Clay accounting tokens used inside of a bulla

As the clay tokens and bulla became difficult to store and handle, impressing the tokens on clay tablets became increasingly popular. Clay tablets were easier to store, neater to write on, and less likely to be lost. Impressing the tokens on clay tablets was more efficient but using a stylus to inscribe the impression on the clay tablet was shown to be even more efficient and much faster for the scribes. Around 3100 BC signs expressing numerical value began to appear. At this point, clay tokens became obsolete.

During the early Bronze Age, urban economies developed due to urban settlements and the development of trade. The recording of trade became necessary because production, shipments, inventories, and wage payments had to be noted, and merchants needed to preserve records of their transactions. Tokens were replaced by pictographic tablets that could express not only "how many" but also "where, when, and how." This was the beginning of Sumerian cuneiform, the first known writing system, in 3100 BC.

== Precursor to mathematics and accounting ==
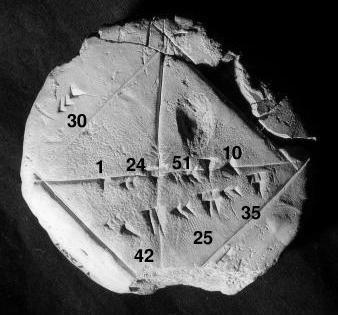
Babylonian clay tablet YBC 7289 with annotations. The diagonal displays an approximation of the square root of 2 in four sexagesimal figures, 1 24 51 10, which is good to about six decimal digits. 1 + 24/60 + 51/60^{2} + 10/60^{3} = 1.41421296... The tablet also gives an example where one side of the square is 30, and the resulting diagonal is 42 25 35 or 42.4263888...

The Sumerians developed a complex system of metrology as early as 3000 BC. From 2600 BC onwards, the Sumerians wrote multiplication tables, division problems, and geometry on clay tablets. The earliest evidence of the Babylonian numerals also date back to this period. This evidence may suggest that the use of bullae led to early forms of mathematics and accounting. Denise Schmandt-Besserat of the University of Texas at Austin in the early 1970s is noted for her research and theory of the evolution of bullae into mathematics. She suggested that the earliest tokens were simple shapes and were comparatively unadorned; they represented basic agricultural commodities such as grain and sheep. They could also have a specific shape to represent the quantity of a particular item. For example, two jars of oil would be represented by two ovoids, three jars by three ovoids, and so on.

With the development of cities came a more complex economy and more complex social structures. This complexity was reflected in the tokens, which begin to appear in a much greater diversity of shapes with more complicated designs of incisions and holes.

Tokens were collected and stored in bullae, either for future promised transactions or as a record of past transactions. The practice of storing tokens in clay envelopes was more significant for the development of mathematics; initially, because these clay envelopes were not transparent; they would have to be broken open to determine the contents. However, by impressing the tokens on the outside of the envelope before sealing them inside, this necessity could be avoided. The outside marks could then serve as a reference and the envelope would only need to be broken open to check the actual contents if there was a dispute about the marks.

A further development involved impressing tokens to make marks on a solid lump of clay or a tablet. Only the tablet was then kept. Because of the complicated shapes and designs of the complex tokens, which did not transfer well by impression, an image of the token would be drawn on the clay instead. This practice, in place by about 3000 BC, afforded greater ease of use and storage, at a price of a certain loss of security. These impressed or drawn marks on the clay tablets were thus the beginnings of a numeration system.

== Clay bullae as seals ==
As papyrus and parchment gradually replaced clay tablets, bullae became the new encasement for scrolls of this new writing style. Documents were split into two halves, separated in the middle by multiple perforations. The top half was rolled into a scroll and a cord would wrap this section tight, going through the perforations. Clay was impressed on the cord to avoid unauthorized reading and the bottom of the document was then wrapped around the initial scroll. Bullae found in dig sites that appear concave and smooth and unmarked are thus these initial molds of clay placed around the interior scroll. A new cord was introduced around the document and a bullae attached to the ends of the cord, on the knot of the cord, or around the cord in its entirety, forming a ring. These outer rings could not guarantee unauthorized access to the documents as one could simply slip out the parchment and replace the bullae "ring" with one of their choosing.

Multi-stamped bulla (~1" diam.) formerly surrounding a dangling cord; unprovenanced Redondo Beach, California collection of antiquities

Designs were inscribed on the clay seals to mark ownership, identify witnesses or partners in commerce, or control of government officials. The later “official” seals were usually larger than private seals and could be designated seals of office, with inscriptions only identifying the office. In many cases, fingerprints of the person who made the impression remain visible near the border of the seal in the clay. Various forms of bullae have been found in archeological digs.

== Archeological finds and digs ==
The earliest known tokens are those from two sites in the Zagros region of Iran: Tepe Asiab and Ganj-i-Dareh Tepe. Schmandt-Besserat was able to work back in time and saw the same shapes from cuneiform to pictographs to these tokens. Most of these tokens have no translation though.

Later, tokens transitioned into cylinders. Around the sixth century BC, cylinders were used in international exchanges between empires. A famous one discovered is the Cyrus Cylinder. The Cyrus Cylinder is famous for its suggested evidence of Cyrus' policy of repatriation of the Hebrew people after their captivity in Babylon, as the text refers to the restoration of cult sanctuaries and repatriation of deported peoples.

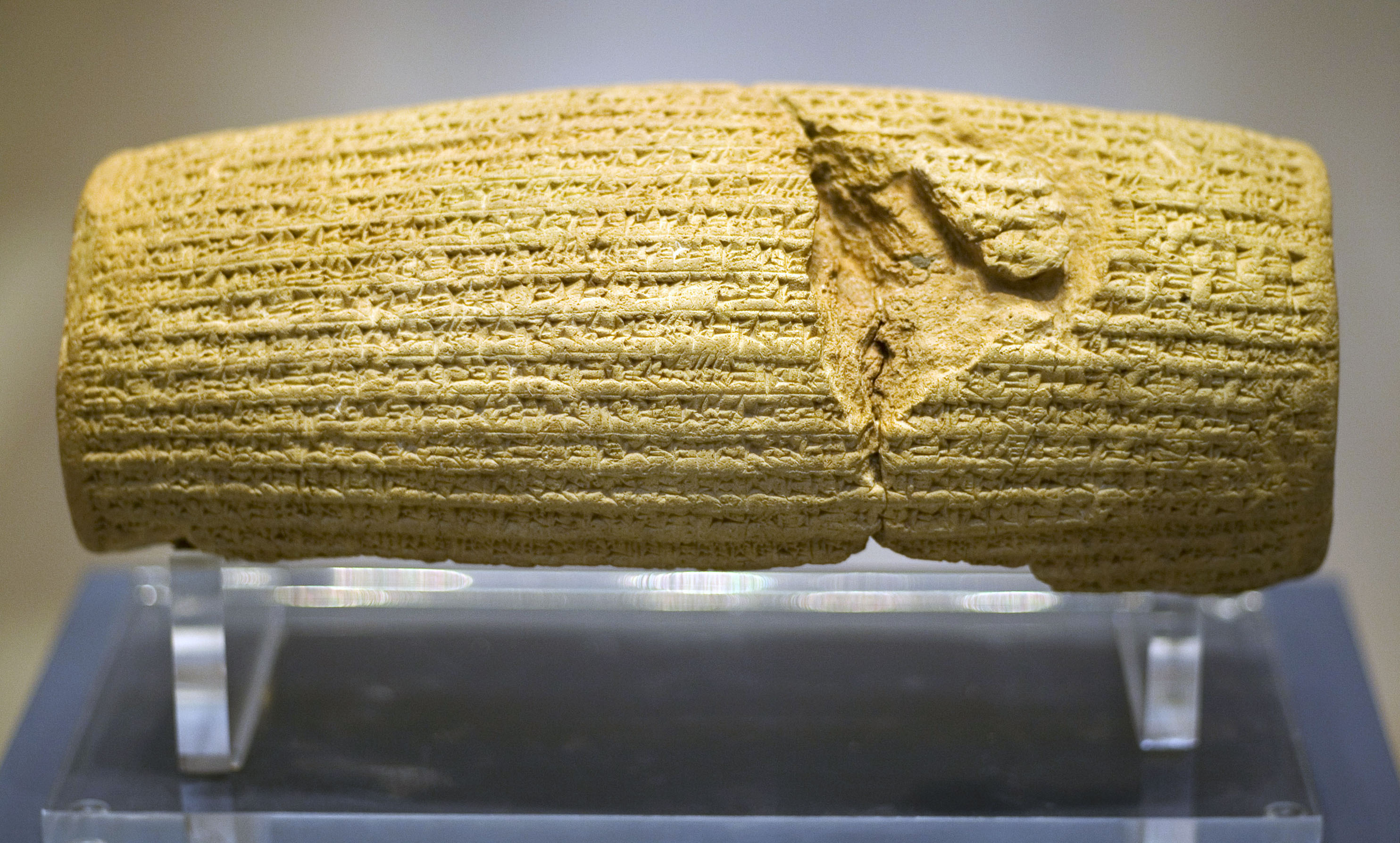
Front view of a barrel-shaped clay cylinder resting on a stand. The cylinder is covered with lines of cuneiform text

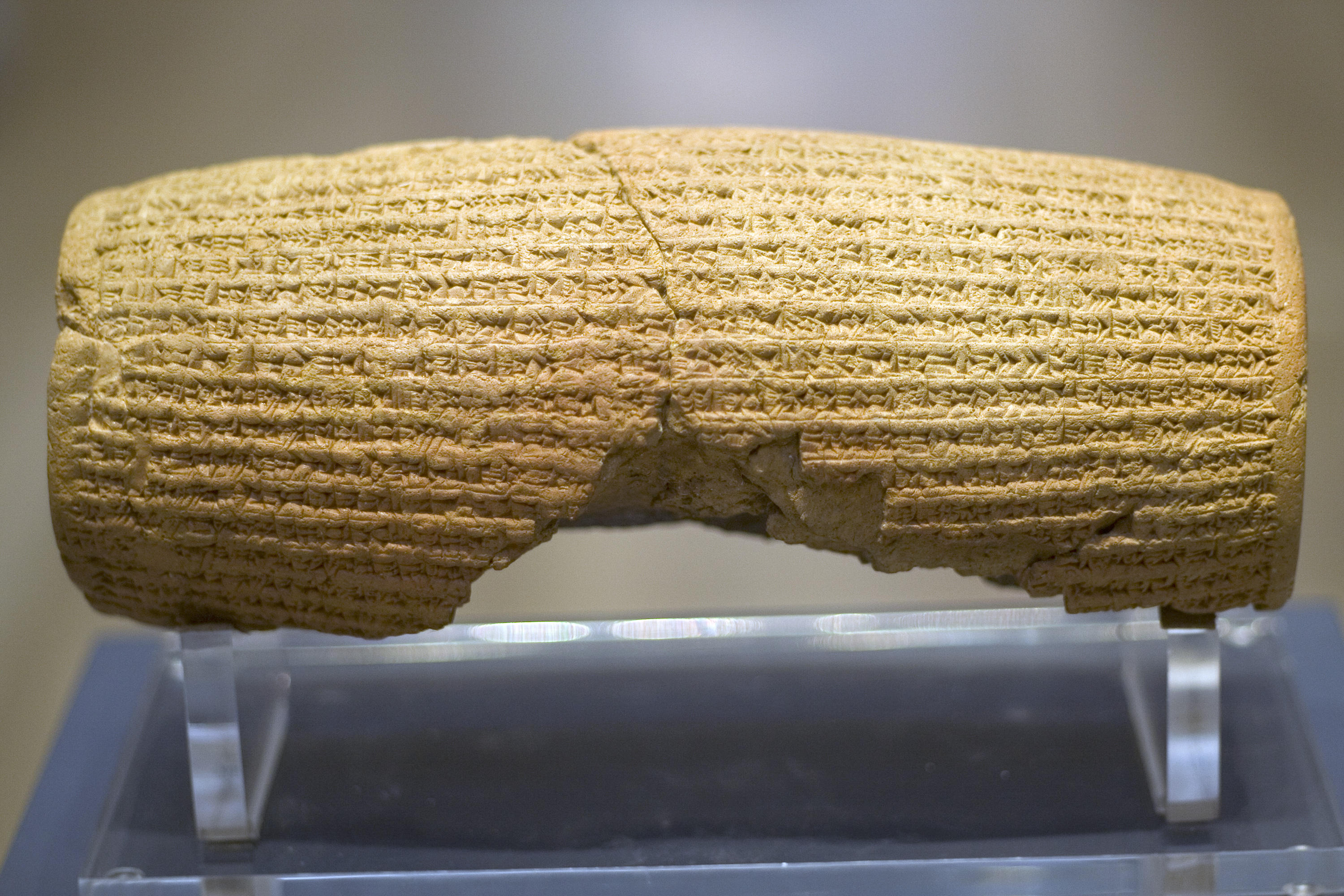
Rear view of a barrel-shaped clay cylinder resting on a stand. The cylinder is covered with lines of cuneiform text

A number of clay bullae from the Sasanian era have been discovered at various Sasanian sites assisting in identifying personal names, government offices, and religious positions. Scholars seem to agree on the typology and purpose of bullae in both civil and domestic environments. The bullae for the administration were generally un-iconic and exclusively epigraphic. It gave the names of administrative provinces and the titles of offices such as those of finance and justice. On the other hand, those bullae used for royals and important functionaries generally bear the owner’s bust accompanied by an inscription giving the name and title. Private seals and impressions, distinguished by a single motif sometimes accompanied by an inscription, provide a rich variety of iconographic patterns, largely reflecting the contemporary cultural and religious traditions of Iran, though only indirectly explained by the inscriptions accompany them.

== Research ==
French-American archaeologist Denise Schmandt-Besserat focused much of her career on the discovery of over 8,000 ancient tokens found in the Middle East. She initially visited museums all around the world studying tablets, bricks, and pots and was surprised to find small clay spheres dating from 10,000 to 6,000 BC in every museum. There wasn’t much information on these clay marbles and archaeologists didn’t know too much about them. Schmandt-Besserat put aside her research on clay and devoted herself to figuring out the use of these clay marbles.

Within a year of studying these unknown clay marbles, Schmandt-Besserat determined that they were tokens that were supposed to be grouped together and that they thus formed some sort of counting system. The transition between hunting and gathering to settling and agriculture took place in the period 8,000 to 7,500 BC in the Ancient Near East and involved a need to store grains and other goods. Schmandt-Besserat discovered that these tokens were used to count food products.

== Metal bullae and later usage ==
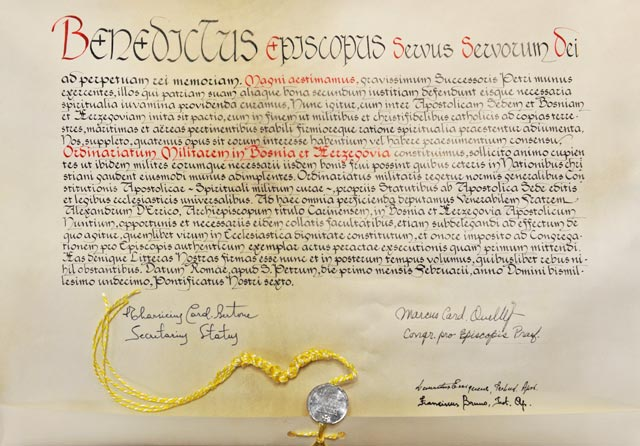
A modern bulla attached by yellow cord to the Apostolic constitution Magni aestimamus issued by Pope Benedict XVI in 2011.

The term bulla was eventually applied to seals made out of metal. Although the most typical form of bulla was made of lead, it was sometimes made of gold, as the ones affixed to the several Golden Bulls issued by the Byzantine Emperors, Holy Roman Emperors, and various other monarchs in the Middle Ages. A particularly famous type of lead bulla is the one affixed to important documents issued by the Pope, called Papal bulls for the type of seal, where the bulla has an image of Saints Peter and Paul on one side and the name of the issuing Pope on the other.

Bullae continued through the Seleucid period of Mesopotamia into Islamic times until paper and wax seals gradually replaced the clay and metal bullae.

== Gallery ==
Stamped clay bulla sealed by a servant of King Hezekiah, formerly pressed against a cord; unprovenanced Redondo Beach collection of antiquities

Same stamped bulla (~12 mm long) showing ridges on cord side indicating papyrus document

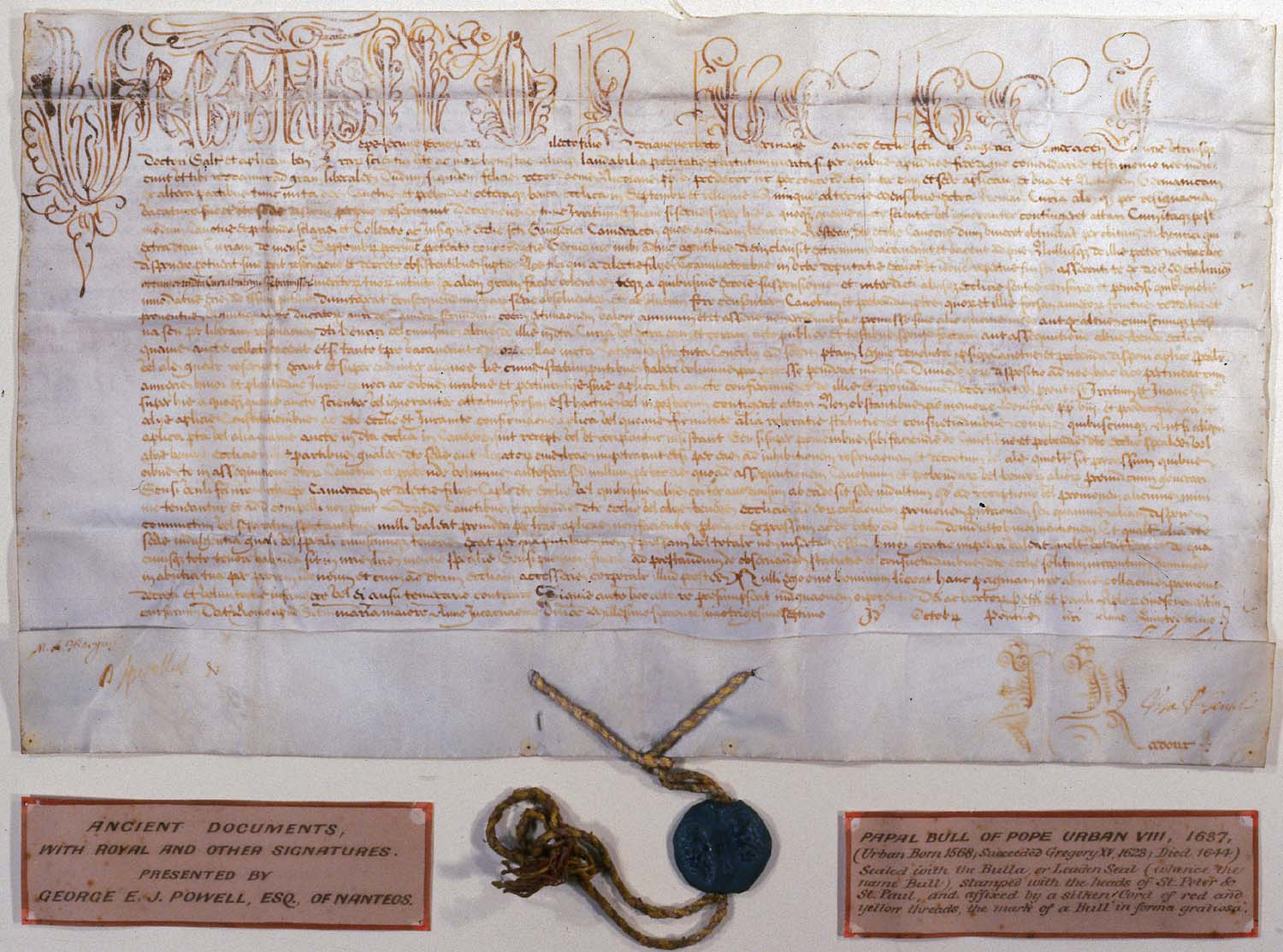
A bull of Pope Urban VIII. Note the lead seal attached to the cord.

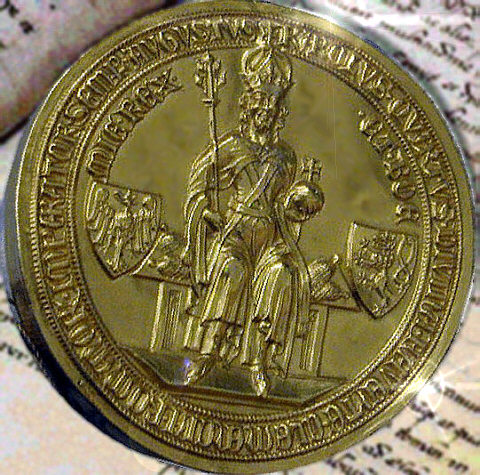
The bulla of the Golden Bull of 1356, issued by Holy Roman Emperor Charles IV

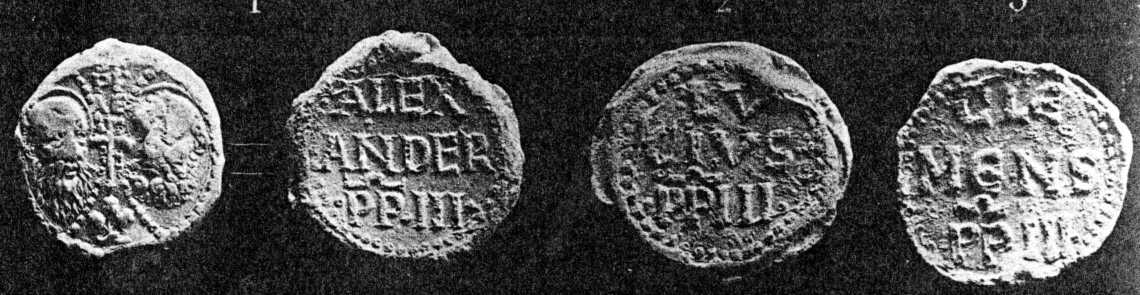
Various papal bullae from the twelfth century.

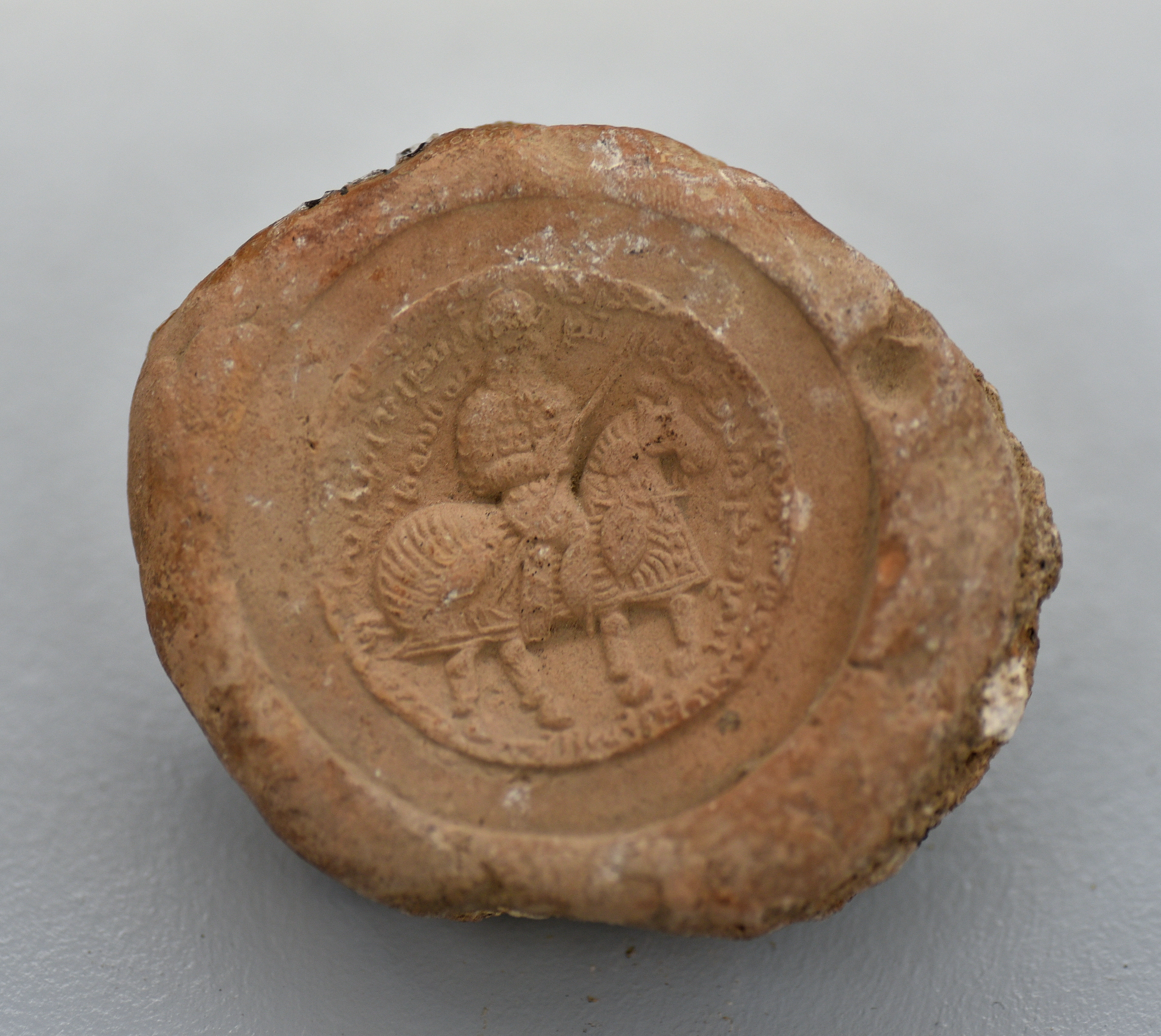
Bulla, Spahbed of Nemroz, General of the Southern Quarter, Sassanian, 6th century AD, from Iraq. The Sulaymaniyah Museum

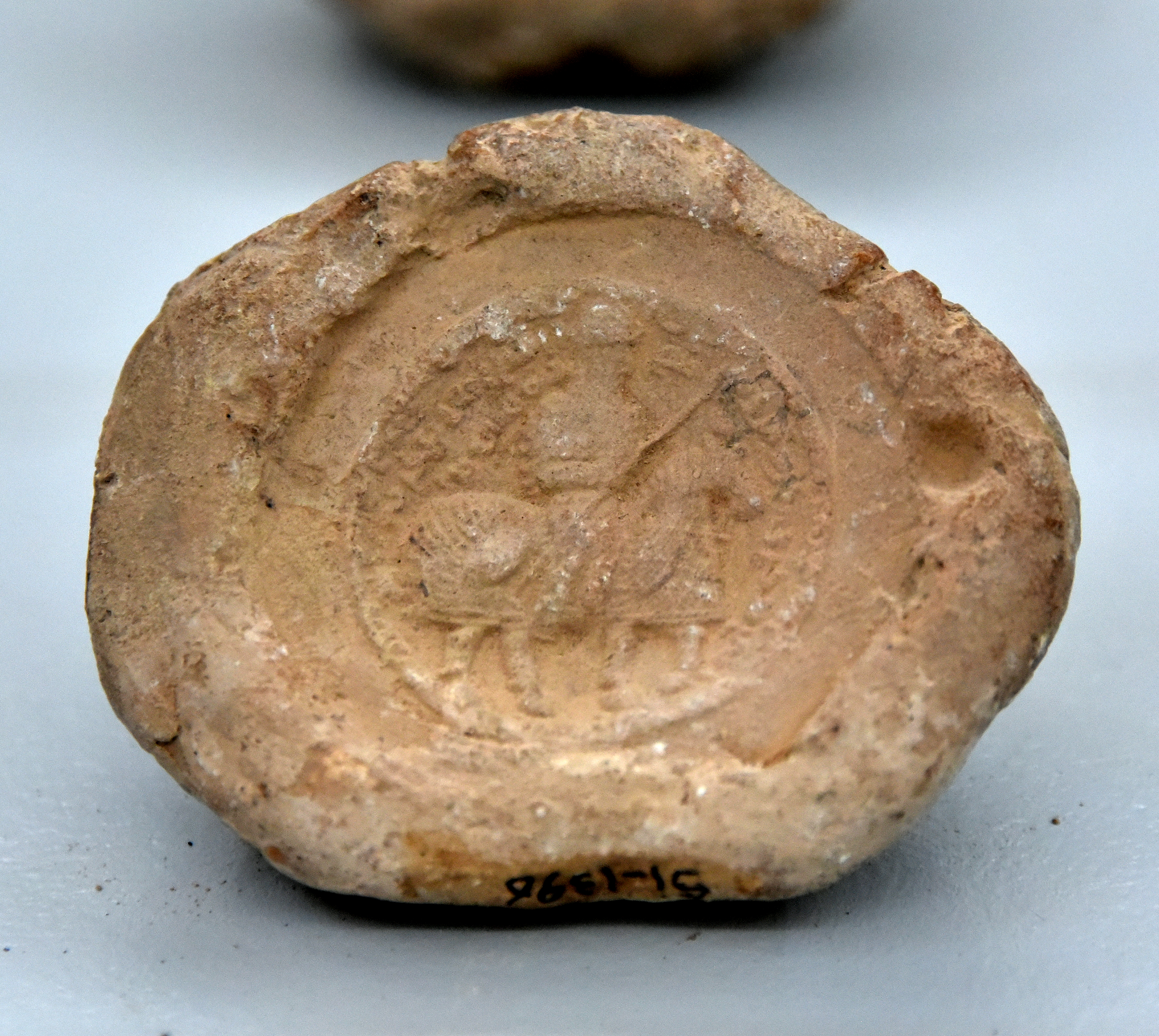
Bulla, Spahbed of Nemroz, General of the Southern Quarter, Sassanian, 6th century AD, from Iraq. Sulaymaniyah Museum

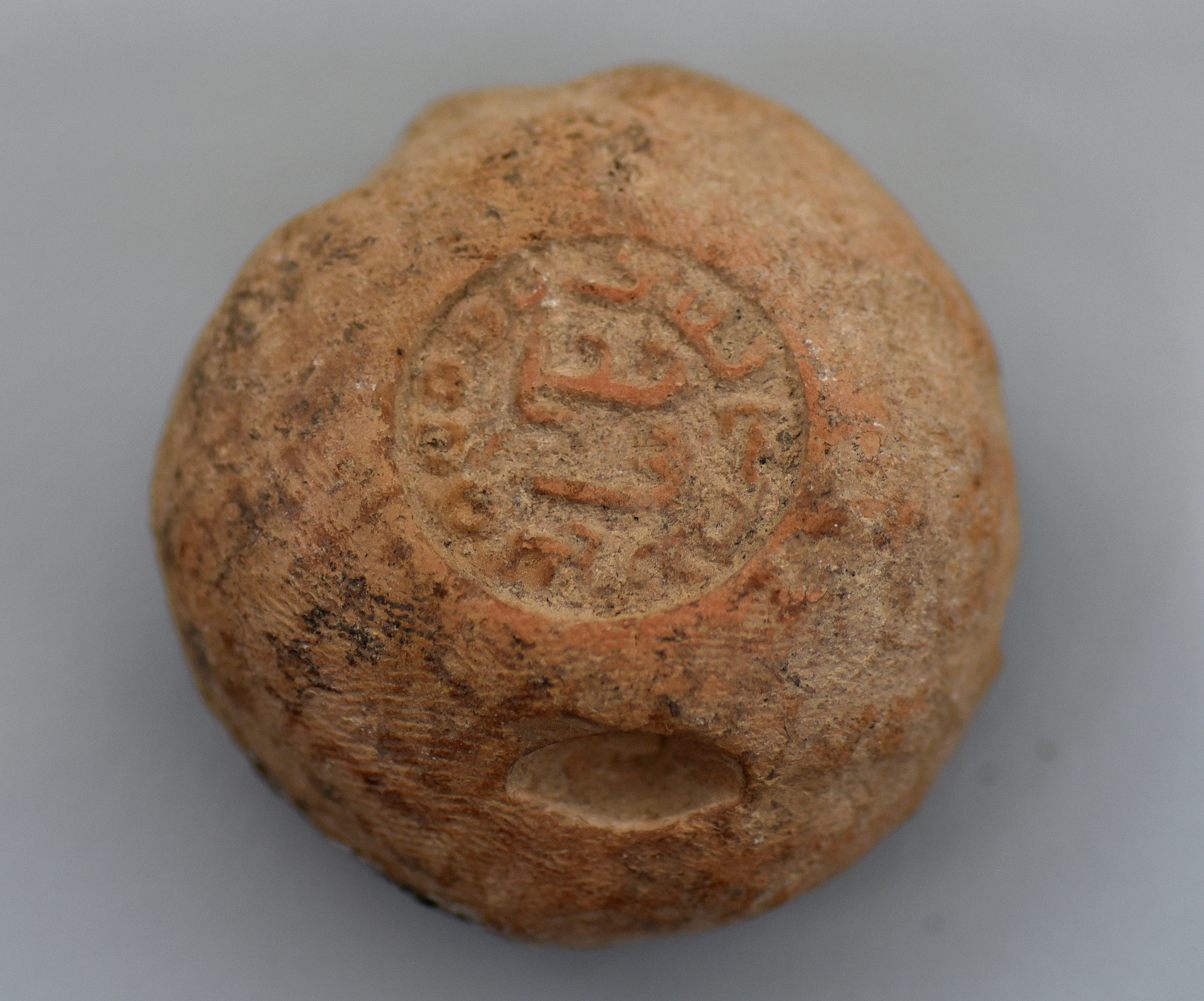
Bulla, Ostandar of Sin, Governor of Sind/Hind, 6th to 7th century AD, from Iraq. Sulaymaniyah Museum

== See also ==
- Bulla (amulet)
- Papal bull
- List of artifacts significant to the Bible
- Seal (emblem)
- History of writing
- History of accounting
- History of mathematics
