= History of writing =

Survey of eight prominent scripts (left to right, top to bottom): Sumerian cuneiform, Egyptian hieroglyphs, Chinese characters, Maya script, Devanagari, Latin alphabet, Arabic alphabet, Braille

The history of writing traces the development of writing systems and how their use transformed different societies. The use of writing – as well as the resulting phenomena of literacy and literary culture in some historical instances – has had myriad social and psychological consequences.

Each historical invention of writing, the first being within the last 6,000 years, emerged from systems of proto-writing that used ideographic and mnemonic symbols but were not capable of fully recording spoken language, and only a subset of spoken languages have been represented in writing. True writing, where the content of linguistic utterances can be accurately reconstructed by later readers, is a later development. As proto-writing is not capable of fully reflecting the grammar and lexicon used in languages, it is often only capable of encoding broad or imprecise information.

Early uses of writing included documenting agricultural transactions and contracts, but it was soon used in the areas of finance, religion, government, and law. Writing allowed the spread of these social modalities and their associated knowledge, and ultimately the further centralization of political power.

== Terminology ==
Writing systems typically satisfy three criteria. Firstly, writing has some purpose or meaning to it. Secondly, writing systems make use of specific symbols which may be recorded on some writing medium. Thirdly, the symbols used in writing generally correspond to elements of spoken language. In general, systems of symbolic communication like signage, painting, maps, and mathematical notation are distinguished from writing systems, which require knowledge of an associated language to read a text.

The norms of writing generally evolve more slowly than those of speech; as a result, linguistic features are frequently preserved in the written form of a language after they cease to appear in the corresponding spoken language.

== Origin of symbolic representations ==
If the inclusive reading of writing is taken to include engraving, inscription and mural-type drawings in caves, then the history of writing receives a significantly more broad historical basis. A shell engraved by Homo erectus was determined to be between 430,000 and 540,000 years old. A set of eight 130,000 years old white-tailed eagle talons bear cut marks and abrasion that indicate manipulation by neanderthals, possibly for using it as jewelry. A series of tiny, drilled snail shells about 75,000 years old—were discovered in a South African cave. Containers that may have been used to hold paints have been found dating as far back as 100,000 years.

Lascaux is used as a brief description of the "Lascaux Cave", which is a network of caves near the village of Montignac, in the department of Dordogne in southwestern France. Over 600 parietal wall paintings cover the interior walls and ceilings of the cave. The paintings represent primarily large animals, typical local contemporary fauna that correspond with the fossil record of the Upper Paleolithic in the area. They are the combined effort of many generations. With continued debate, the age of the paintings is now usually estimated at 18,000 to 22,000 years (early Magdalenian), well before the representational use of symbolic depictions of human speech.

== Emergence ==
Population centres of Sumer in southern Mesopotamia

Before the 20th century, most scholarly theories of the origins of writing involved some form of monogenesis, the assumption that writing had been invented only once as cuneiform in ancient Sumer, and spread across the world from there via cultural diffusion. According to these theories, writing was such a particular technology that exposure through activities like trade was a much more likely means of acquisition than independent reinvention. Specifically, many theories depended on a literal interpretation of the Book of Genesis, and reflect the relative focus given to locations in Mesopotamia in the Genesis narrative. Over time, greater awareness of the systems of pre-Columbian Mesoamerica conclusively established that writing had been independently invented multiple times. Four independent inventions of writing are most commonly recognized – in Mesopotamia c. 3400 – c. 3100 BC, in Egypt c. 3250 BC, in China before c. 1250 BC, and in Mesoamerica before c. 1 AD.

According to statistical research in 2026, carved symbols and markings from Stone Age Germany from around 40,000 years ago have similarities to early Mesopotamian proto-cuneiform symbols and could be the earliest known precursors to writing systems.

Sumerian cuneiform and Egyptian hieroglyphs both gradually evolved from proto-writing between 3400 and 3100 BC, with the earliest coherent texts appearing c. 2600 BC. Regarding Egyptian hieroglyphs, scholars point to very early differences with Sumerian cuneiform "in structure and style" as to why the two systems "[must] have developed independently", and if any "stimulus diffusion" of writing did occur, it only served to transmit the bare idea of writing between cultures. Due to the lack of direct evidence for the transfer of writing, "no definitive determination has been made as to the origin of hieroglyphics in ancient Egypt."

During the 1990s, symbols inscribed between 3400 and 3200 BC were discovered at Abydos – which initially caused some scholars to doubt the assumption that the Mesopotamian sign system predated the Egyptian one. However, scholars have noted that the attestation at Abydos is singular and sudden, while the gradual evolution of the Mesopotamian system is lengthy and well-documented, with its predecessor token system used in agriculture and accounting attested as early as 8000 BC.

The Proto-Elamite script is also believed to have been used during this period, though Proto-Elamite inscriptions "have been, and will remain, highly problematic in a discussion of writing because they represent a very unclear period of literacy".

There is no evidence of contact between the Chinese Shang dynasty (c. 1600 – c. 1050 BC) and the literate civilizations of the Near East, and the methods of logographic and phonetic representation in Chinese characters are distinct from those used in cuneiform and hieroglyphs. As such, written Chinese is considered to be an independent development.

=== Proto-writing ===
Accounting tokens

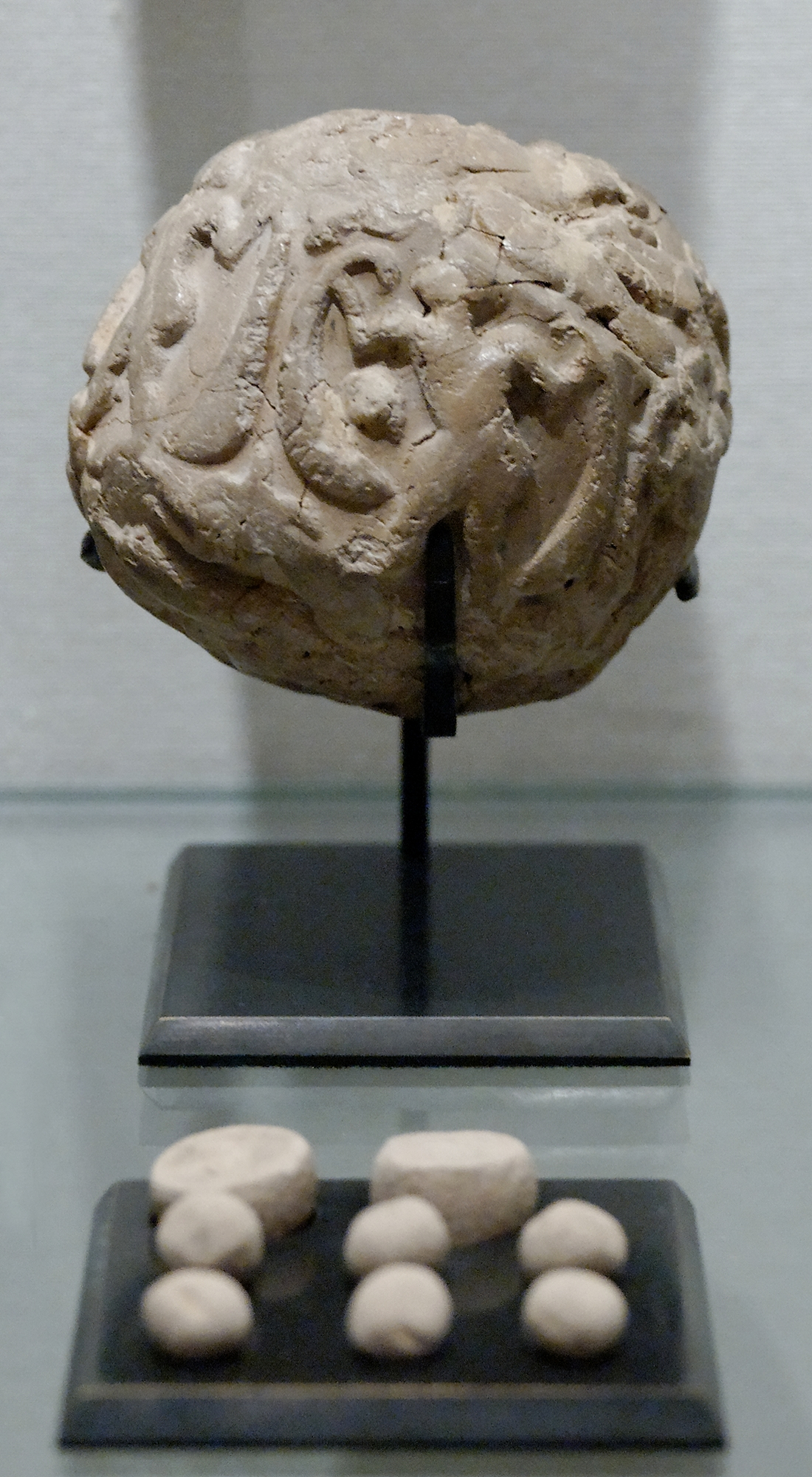
Clay bulla and tokens – Susa (4000–3100 BC)

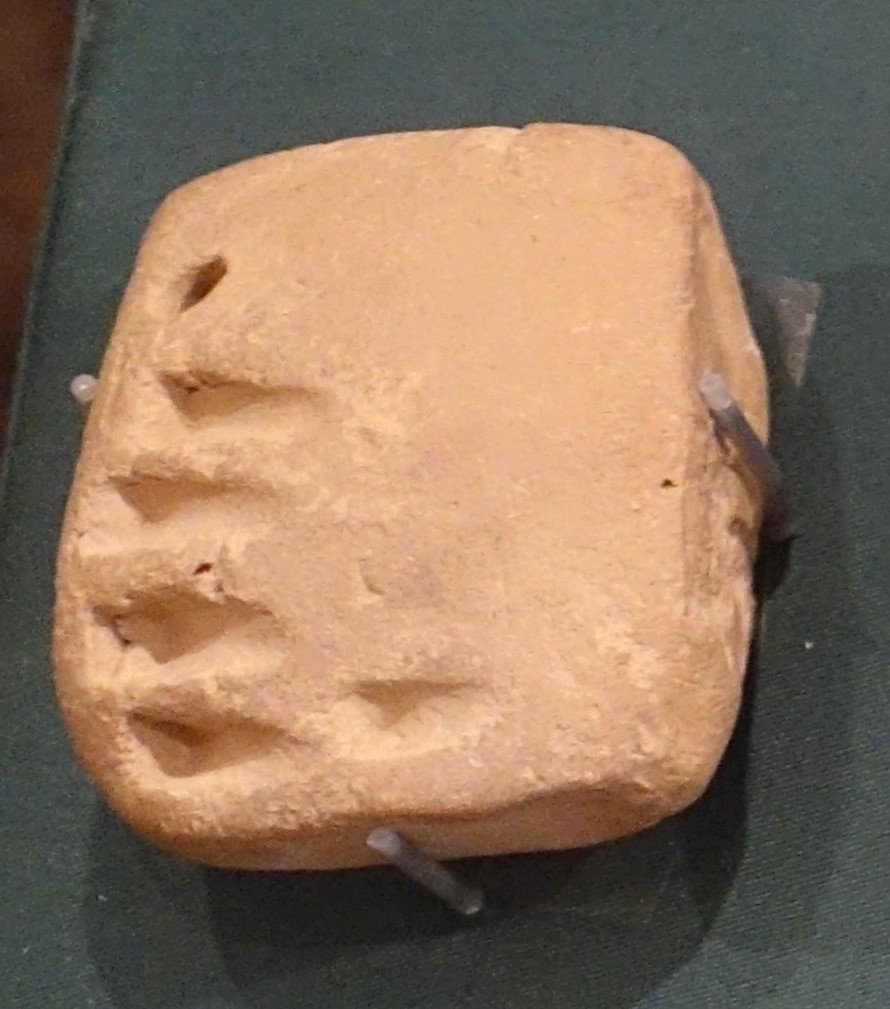
Numerical tablet – Khafajah, Uruk V (3500–3350 BC)

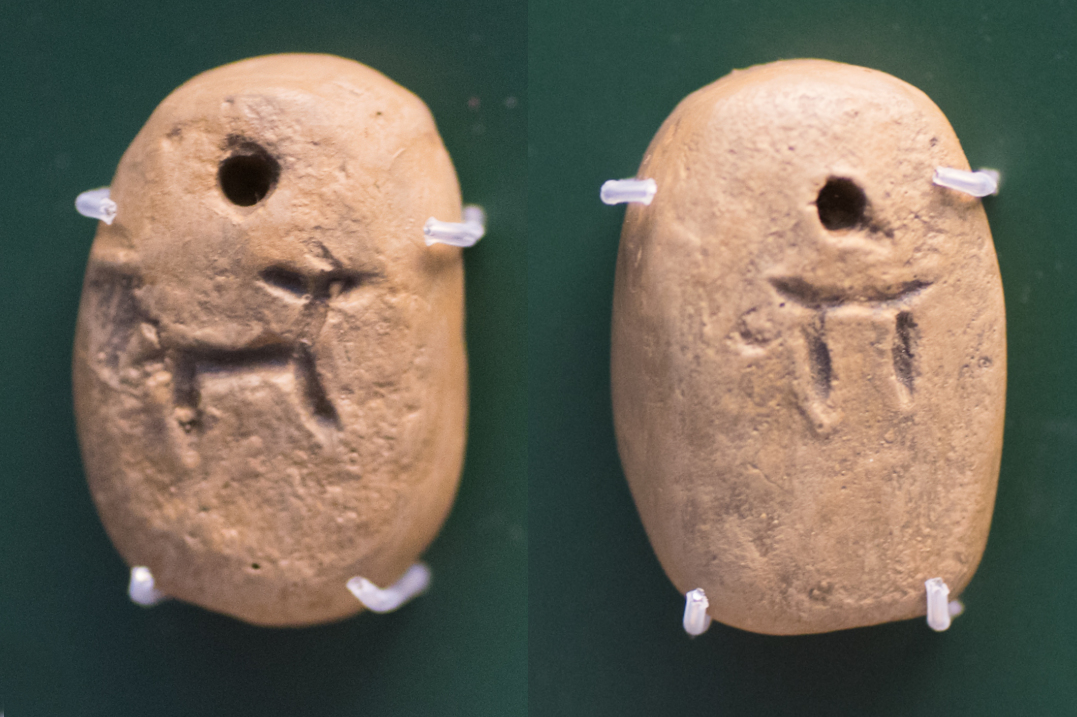
Pre-cuneiform tags depicting a goat or sheep alongside a numeral, likely "10" – Al-Hasakah (3300–3100 BC)

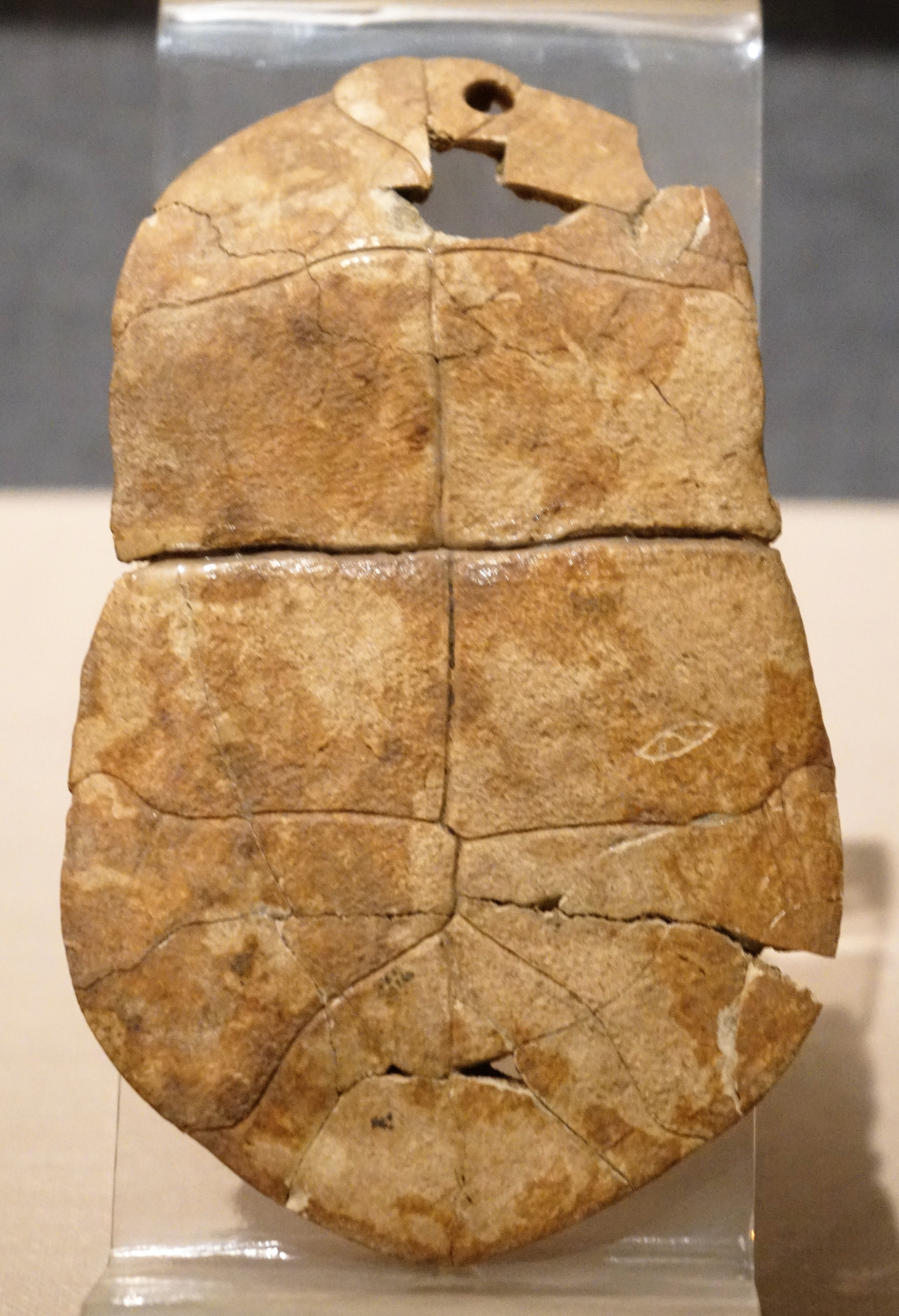
Turtle plastron inscribed with an eye-like symbol – Jiahu, China (c. 6000 BC)

In each case where writing was invented independently, it emerged from systems of proto-writing, which used ideographic and mnemonic symbols to communicate information, but did not record human language directly. Historically, most proto-writing systems did not produce writing systems; the earliest writing dates to the Early Bronze Age (3300–2100 BC), but proto-writing is attested as early as the 7th millennium BC. Examples of proto-writing during the Neolithic and Bronze Age include:

- The Jiahu symbols carved into tortoise shells, found in 24 Neolithic graves excavated at Jiahu in northern China and dated to the 7th millennium BC. The majority of the signs uncovered were inscribed individually or in small groups on different shells. Most archaeologists do not consider the Jiahu symbols to be linked to the emergence of true writing.
- The Vinča symbols found on artefacts of the Vinča culture of central and southeastern Europe, dated to the 6th–5th millennia BC.
- Indigenous Australians used flattened or cylindrical lengths of wood as message sticks, which were engraved with symbols that conveyed complex information. As they were created with organic material, no pre-contact examples have yet been discovered, though correlations have been found between symbols in ancient Australian petroglyphs (the oldest worldwide being those at Murujuga in Western Australia, which date to 40,000–50,000 years ago) and those used on message sticks.

The Indus script (c. 2600 – c. 2000 BC), found on different types of artefacts produced by the Indus Valley Civilization on the Indian subcontinent, remains undeciphered, and whether it functioned as true writing is not agreed upon. While its origins are not visually obvious, the opportunity for Mesopotamian cultural diffusion to have introduced the concept of writing to the Indus peoples is clear.

Later examples include quipu, a system of knotted cords used as mnemonic devices within the Inca Empire (15th century AD).

== Bronze Age ==
=== Cuneiform ===
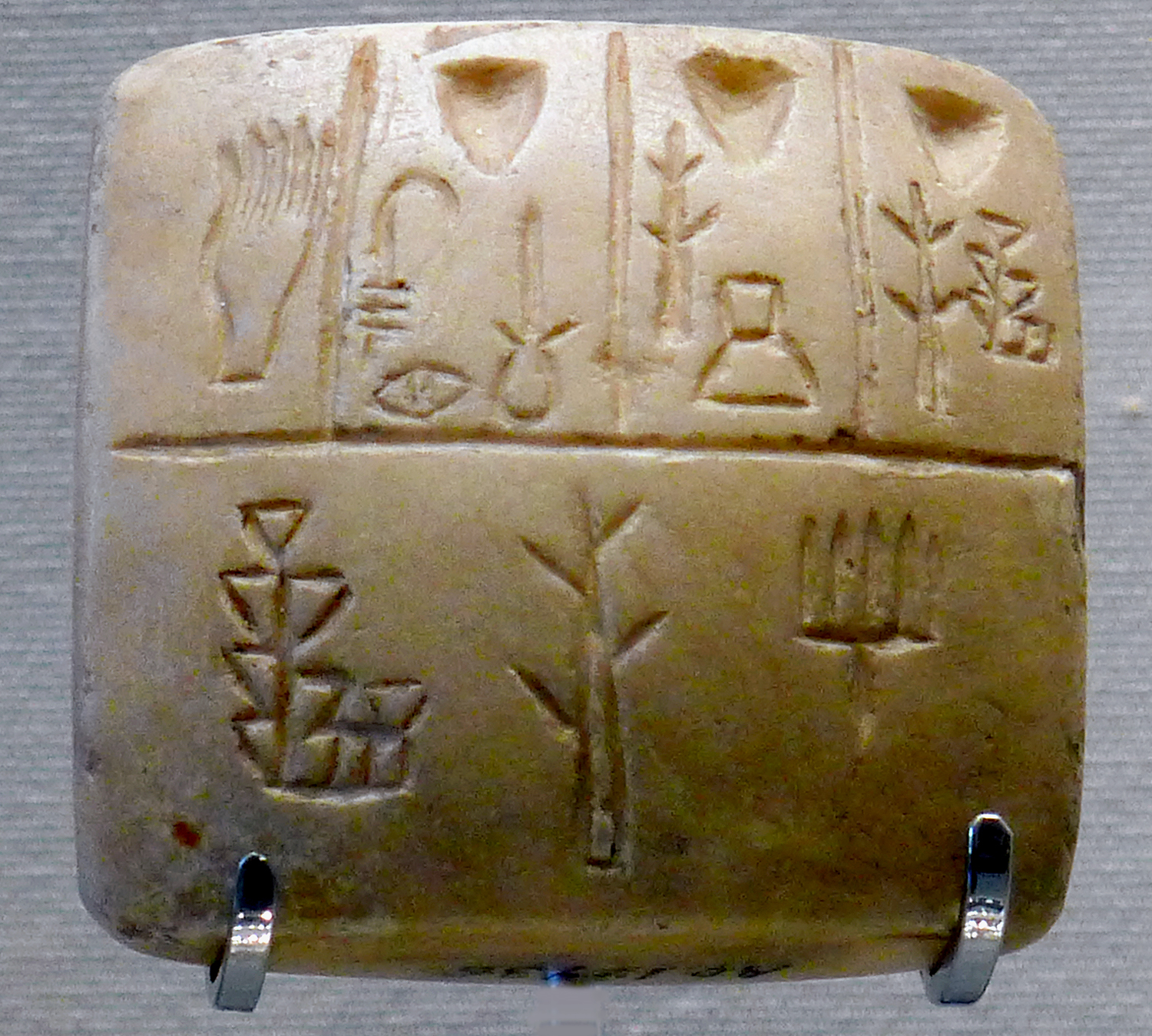
Tablet with proto-cuneiform pictographs – Uruk III (late 4th millennium BC)

Cuneiform writing (from Latin cuneus, lit. 'wedge') emerged in southern Mesopotamia during the late 4th millennium BC as a means of keeping accounts. Initially, proto-cuneiform developed as a numeral system where a round stylus was pressed into clay tablets, with distinct shapes made by applying the stylus at different angles; this system was gradually augmented with pictographic marks indicating what was being counted, which were made using a sharp stylus. By the 29th century BC, writing using a wedge-shaped stylus additionally included phonetic elements which represented syllables of the Sumerian language – becoming a general-purpose writing system which gradually replaced round-stylus and sharp-stylus markings during the 27th and 26th centuries BC.

From the 26th century BC, the system was adapted to write the Akkadian language which had spread across southern Mesopotamia as Sumerian ceased to be spoken – with Akkadian writing appearing in significant quantities c. 2350 BC. From Akkadian, cuneiform was subsequently adapted to write other languages, including Hurrian and Hittite. Scripts similar in appearance to this writing system include those for Ugaritic and Old Persian.

In 1977, archaeologist Denise Schmandt-Besserat proposed a theory that linked the development of cuneiform to a system of clay tokens used to track and exchange commodities in southern Mesopotamia from c. 8000 BC. The theory is widely contested among researchers of writing systems, with those arguing against a causal link including Geoffrey Sampson and Christopher Woods.

=== Egyptian hieroglyphs ===
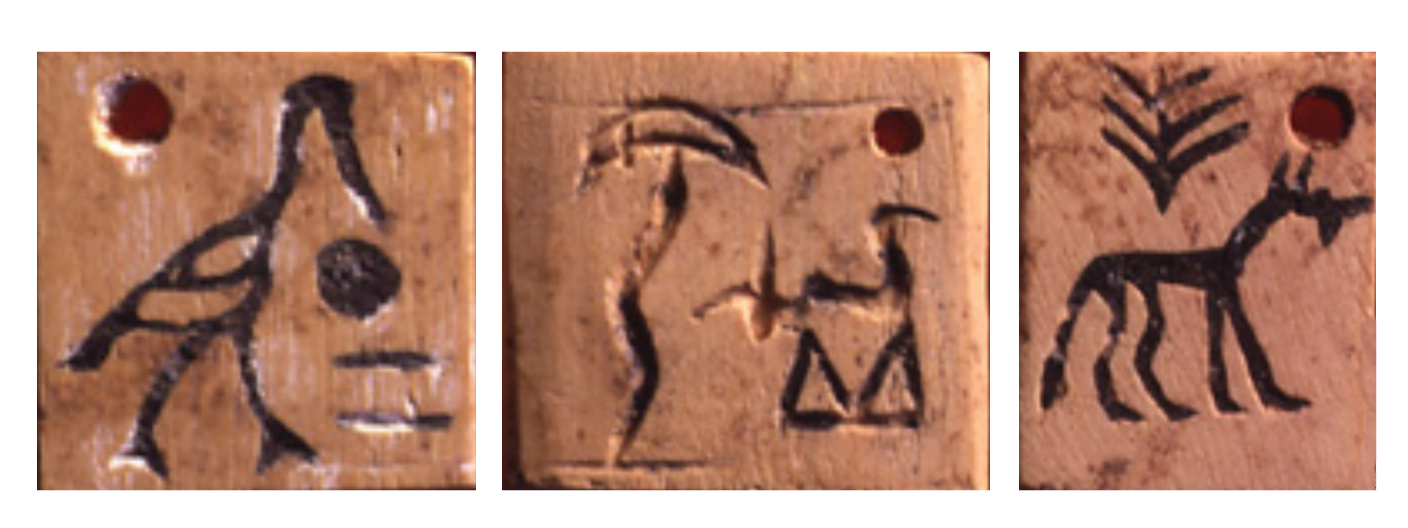
Designs on tokens bearing similarities to contemporary clay tags from Uruk – Abydos, Egypt (3400‍–‍3200 BC)

Geoffrey Sampson states that Egyptian hieroglyphs "came into existence a little after Sumerian script, and, probably [were], invented under the influence of the latter", and that it is "probable that the general idea of expressing words of a language in writing was brought to Egypt from Sumerian Mesopotamia". However, more recent scholars have held that the evidence for direct influence is sparse. During the 1990s, the discovery of glyphs at Abydos dated between 3400 and 3200 BC has challenged the hypothesis that writing diffused from Mesopotamia to Egypt, pointing instead to the independent development of writing within Egypt. The Abydos glyphs, found in tomb U-J, are written on ivory and are likely labels for other goods found in the grave. While sign usage in Mesopotamian tokens is attested c. 8000 BC, Egyptian writing appears suddenly in the late 4th millennium BC.

Frank J. Yurco states that depictions of pharaonic iconography such as the royal crowns, Horus falcons and victory scenes were concentrated in the Naqada and A-Group cultures of Upper Egypt. He elaborates that "Egyptian writing arose in Naqadan Upper Egypt and A-Group Nubia, and not in the Delta cultures, where the direct Western Asian contact was made, [which] further vitiates the Mesopotamian-influence argument". Gamal Mokhtar argues that the inventory of hieroglyphic symbols derived from "fauna and flora used in the signs [which] are essentially African" and in "regards to writing, we have seen that a purely Nilotic, hence African origin not only is not excluded, but probably reflects the reality", although he acknowledges the geographical location of Egypt made it a receptacle for many influences.

Writing was of political importance to the Egyptian empire, and literacy was concentrated among an educated elite of scribes. Only people from certain backgrounds were allowed to train as scribes, in the service of temple, royal, and military authorities. The original forms of hieroglyphs were intended to be used in inscriptions that – in addition to their basic linguistic purpose – simultaneously served as decorations, propaganda, or aids in ritual, and were time-consuming for scribes to write or carve as a result. For practical writing, hieratic was quickly developed as a cursive form derived from hieroglyphs, and became the style in which the vast majority of Egyptian writing was done. Much later c. the 7th century BC, hieratic was further streamlined to produce the demotic script style.

=== Aegean systems ===
Several syllabic and logographic writing systems were used in the Bronze Age Aegean civilizations (the Mycenaean civilization on the Greek mainland and the Minoan civilization on Crete), which ultimately fell out of use and were forgotten centuries prior to the introduction of the alphabet to the region by the Phoenicians:

- Cretan hieroglyphs (c. 2100−1700 BC), on Crete
- Linear A (c. 1800−1450 BC), yet to be deciphered, on Crete, Aegean Islands, and Laconia
- Linear B (c. 1450−1200 BC), in Knossos on Crete, Pylos, Mycenae, Thebes, and Tiryns on the Greek mainland

=== Early Semitic alphabets ===
The first alphabetic writing was developed by workers in the Sinai Peninsula to write West Semitic languages c. 1800 BC, "in the context of cultural exchanges between Semitic-speaking people from the Levant and communities in Egypt". This earliest attested form is known as the Proto-Sinaitic script, and it adapted concepts and at least some of its written letterforms from Egyptian hieroglyphic writing; it adopted wholly West Semitic sound values for its letters, as opposed to adapting existing Egyptian ones. Precise dating of its origin, as well as the graphical origins of many letterforms (if any) remain unclear, and the script remains undeciphered. These early abjads (where letters generally represent only the consonantal sounds of a language) remained of marginal importance for several centuries; it is only towards the end of the Bronze Age that forms of Proto-Sinaitic script split into the Proto-Canaanite alphabet (c. 1400 BC), the undeciphered Byblos syllabary, and the Ancient South Arabian script (c. 1200 BC). Proto-Canaanite, which was probably influenced by the Byblos syllabary, in turn inspired the Ugaritic alphabet (c. 1300 BC).

The Phoenician alphabet (c. 1050 BC), which was ultimately adapted into the Greek alphabet, is another direct descendant of Proto-Sinaitic.

=== Anatolian hieroglyphs ===
Anatolian hieroglyphs are an indigenous script native to western Anatolia, used to record the Hieroglyphic Luwian language. It first appeared on Luwian royal seals from the 13th century BC.

=== Chinese characters ===
The earliest attested Chinese characters comprise the body of inscriptions on oracle bones and bronze vessels dating to the Late Shang period (c. 1200 – c. 1050 BC), with the earliest of these dated c. 1250 BC.

=== Mesoamerican systems ===
Of several symbol systems used in pre-Columbian Mesoamerica, the Maya script appears to be the best developed. The earliest inscriptions identifiable as Maya date to the 3rd century BC, and the earliest that can be deciphered and read dates to 199 AD. The system was in continuous use from the 1st century AD until shortly after the arrival of the Spanish conquistadors in the 16th century. Maya writing used logograms complemented by a set of syllabic glyphs.

== Iron Age ==
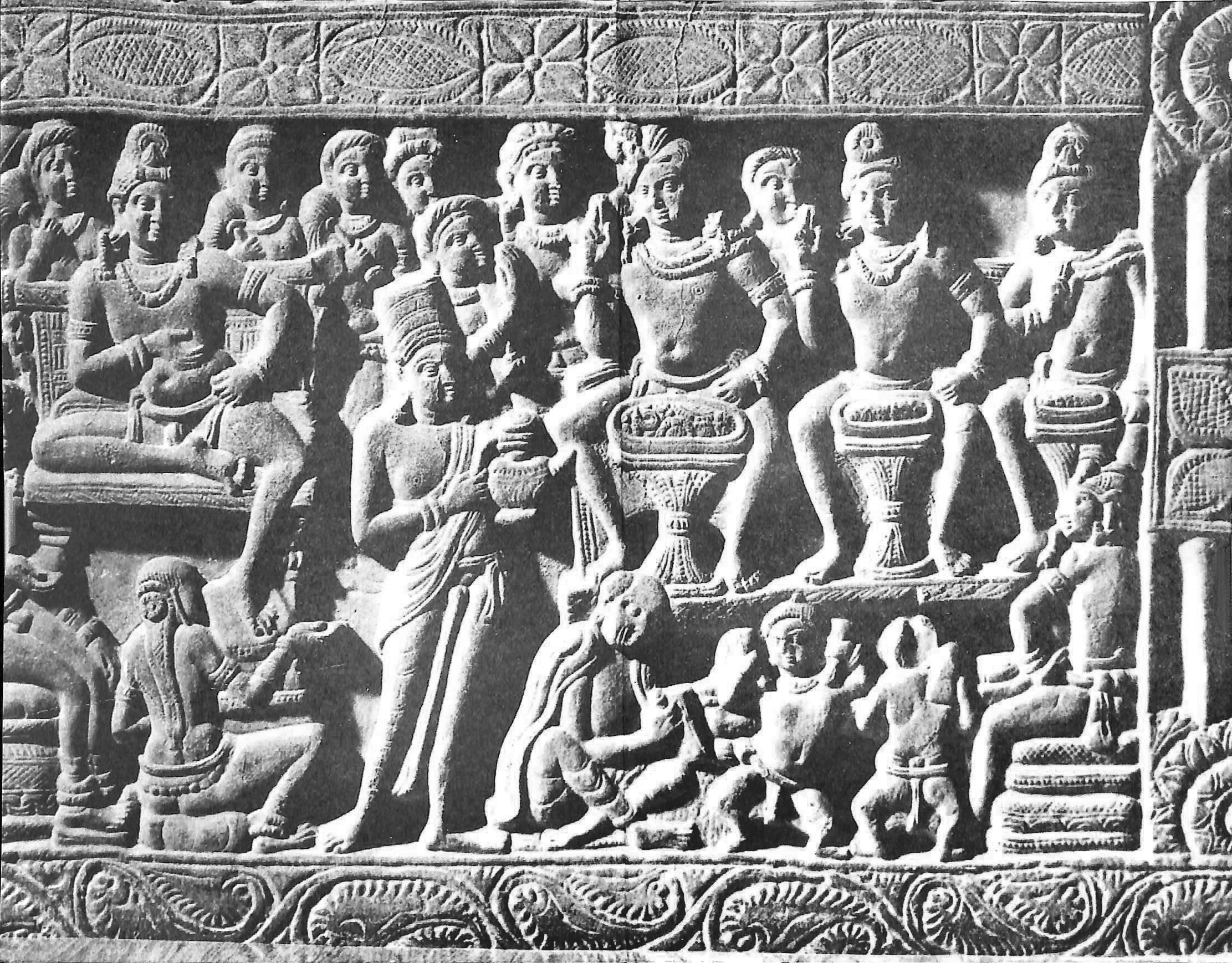
Relief depicting three soothsayers interpreting the dream of Queen Maya, mother of the Buddha, with a scribe seated below recording the interpretation – from Nagarjunakonda, 2nd century AD

During the early 1st millennium BC, speaker groups adapted the Phoenician alphabet into what became the Aramaic and Greek alphabets. Most of the writing systems used throughout Afro-Eurasia descend from either Aramaic or Greek. The Greek alphabet was the first to introduce letters representing vowel sounds. It and its descendant in the Latin alphabet gave rise to several European scripts in the first several centuries AD, including the runic, Gothic, and Cyrillic alphabets. The Aramaic alphabet probably influenced the Brahmic scripts of India, as well as the Square Hebrew, Arabic and Syriac abjads – with descendants as geographically distant as the Mongolian script adopted in East Asia.

The Geʽez script, an abugida native to Ethiopia and Eritrea, descended from the Ancient South Arabian script which branched from Proto-Sinaitic.

=== Greek alphabets ===
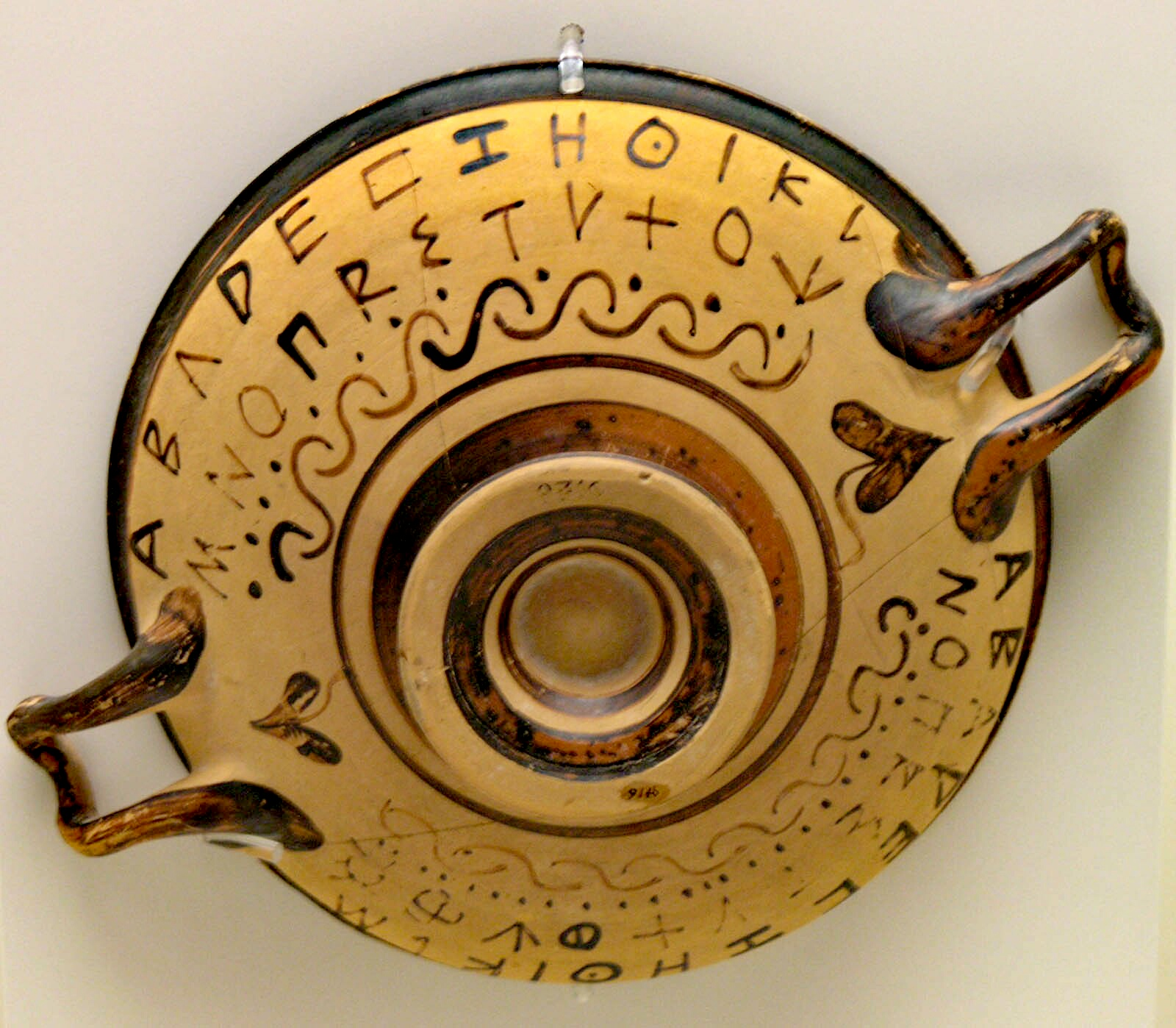
Inscriptions on black-figure pottery using the Early Greek alphabet – National Archaeological Museum, Athens

The history of the Greek alphabet began c. 800 BC, when the Greeks adapted the Phoenician alphabet for their own use. The letters of the Greek alphabet generally visually correspond to those of the Phoenician alphabet, and both came to be arranged using the same alphabetical order.

The Greek alphabet was the first to use dedicated letters for writing vowels. In addition, three letters were added to the end of the Phoenician alphabet, called the "supplementals". Several varieties of the Greek alphabet developed. One, known as the Cumae alphabet, was used west of Athens and in southern Italy. The other, known as Eastern Greek, was used in Asia Minor and by the Athenians, and eventually adopted by the rest of the Greek-speaking world. The Greeks settled on writing from left to right c. 500 BC, but previously wrote from right to left like the Phoenicians – or in lines that alternated direction, starting each line where the previous finished. This is known as boustrophedon writing (lit. 'as the plough-ox turns').

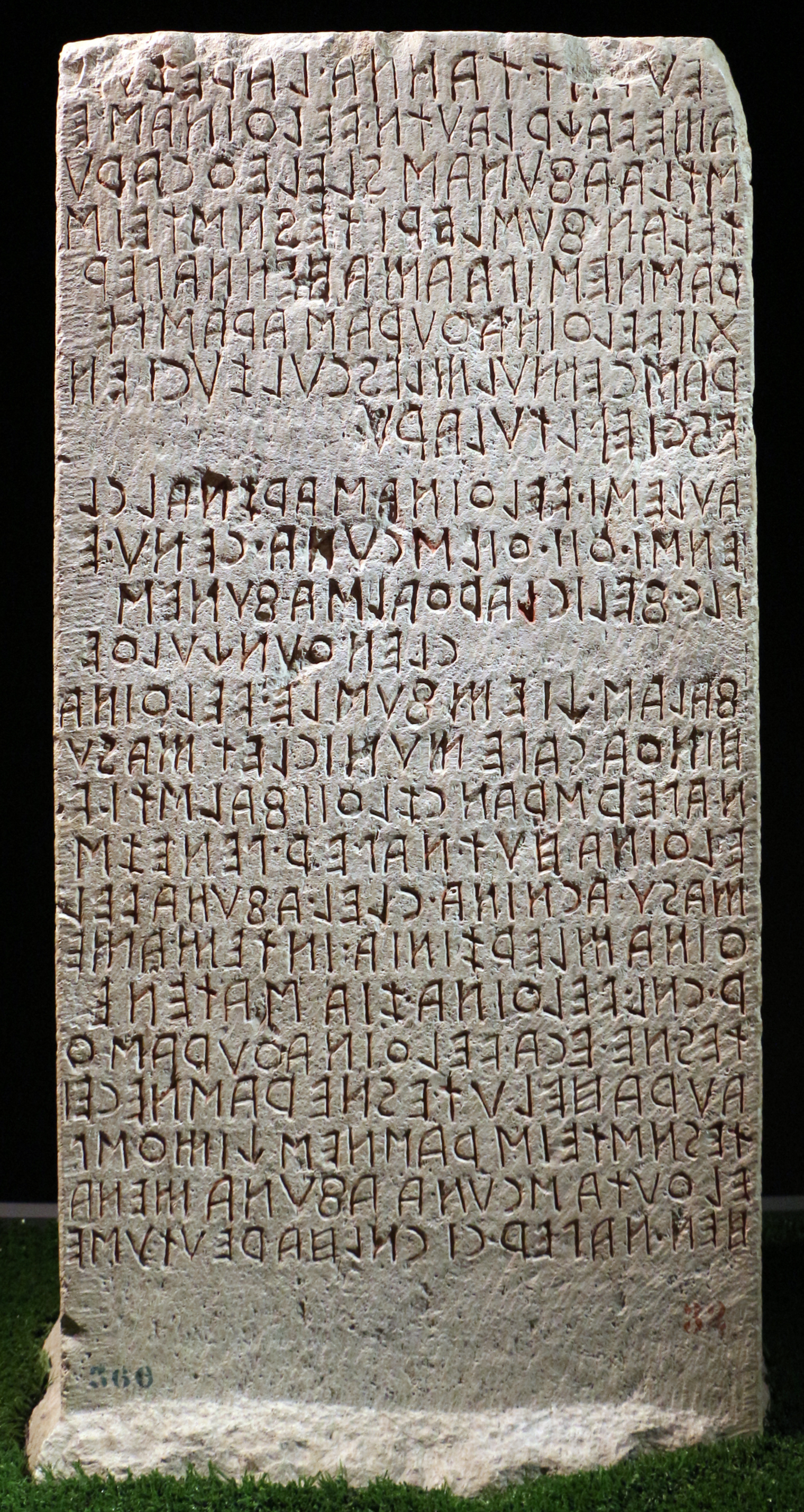
The Cippus Perusinus, a stone tablet inscribed with 46 lines of written Etruscan near Perugia, Italy

=== Italic and Latin alphabets ===
The Greek alphabet is the progenitor of each script currently used to write the languages of Europe. The most widespread descendant of Greek is the Latin script, named for the Latins, a central Italian people who came to dominate Europe with the rise of Rome. The Latin script developed through a chain of adaptations – the Greeks of southern Italy influenced the Etruscan civilization, who adapted the Western Greek alphabet for their own use; in turn, the early Romans borrowed and modified the Etruscan alphabet. Evidence of Latin writing appears as early as the 7th century BC; the script gradually evolved over the following centuries, with all of the Latin letterforms arriving at their modern shapes by c. 100 BC. Owing to the prolonged cultural dominance of Rome over Italy, writing in the other Old Italic scripts has only survived in limited quantities, with the Etruscan language itself having been largely lost.

== Medieval era and modernity ==
After the fall of the Western Roman Empire in the 5th century, the production and transmission of literature that had previously been widespread across the Roman world became largely confined to the Byzantine and Sasanian empires, where the primary literary languages were Greek and Persian respectively – though other languages such as Syriac and Coptic were also important.

The spread of Islam in the 7th century brought about the rapid establishment of Arabic as a major literary language in much of the Mediterranean and Central Asia. Arabic and Persian quickly began to overshadow Greek's role as a language of scholarship. Arabic script was adopted to write the Persian and Old Turkic languages. This script also heavily influenced the development of the cursive scripts of Greek, the Slavic languages, and Latin, among others. The influence of Arabic writing during the Crusades also resulted in the Hindu–Arabic numeral system being adopted throughout Europe. By the 11th century, the city of Córdoba, Andalusia in what is now southern Spain had become one of the world's foremost intellectual centres, and was the site of the largest library in Europe.

By the 14th century, the Renaissance in Europe led to a revival of Greek as a significant literary language, in addition to Latin. A similar though smaller emergence occurred in Eastern Europe, especially in Russia. At the same time Arabic and Persian began a slow decline in importance as the Islamic Golden Age ended. The revival of literacy development in Western Europe led to many innovations in the Latin alphabet and the diversification of the alphabet to codify the spoken forms of the various languages.

The sociolinguistic phenomenon of diglossia arises when the written language used within a society significantly diverges from the spoken language it previously corresponded to, typically as the result of accumulated language changes in ordinary speech not being reflected in writing. The gap between the two forms can ultimately come to distinguish two registers of what is considered the same language system – with the written classical language as the formal, prestigious register, and the spoken vernacular language as an informal, even incorrect register. Throughout the late medieval and modern periods, written vernacular languages around the world were developed that competed with and increasingly displaced the classical languages being used. Historical examples concerning norms of both writing and speech include Italian, Spanish, German, French, and English replacing Latin in Western Europe, written vernacular Chinese replacing Literary Chinese, and the language reform that stripped Ottoman Turkish of most of its Persian and Arabic influences. Often, deliberate language planning and pushes for mass literacy represented one component in broader nation building movements. Two instances where diglossia remains prominent concern vernacular versus written forms of Arabic, and the continued relevance of classical Sinhalese in Sri Lanka.

== Technology and materials ==
The mediums, materials, and technologies used for writing shape what it is used for and what social impact it has. For example, the physical durability of different writing materials directly determines which historical examples of writing have survived for later analysis: while bodies of inscriptions made in stone, bone, or metal from each literate society in antiquity have survived, many contemporaneous manuscript cultures are only attested indirectly.

The common materials in the Mesopotamian world were the tablet and the roll, the former probably having a Chaldean origin, the latter an Egyptian. The tablets of the Chaldeans are small pieces of clay, somewhat crudely shaped into a form resembling a pillow, and thickly inscribed with cuneiform characters. Similarly, hollow cylinders made of terracotta, sometimes glazed, were inscribed with a small stylus, with the writing on some specimens being small enough to require the aid of a magnifying glass.

In Egypt, the primary materials used for writing had different properties. Monuments depict the use of wooden tablets for writing; as early as the 4th millennium BC during the earliest Theban dynasties, papyrus had also been adopted. The papyrus reed grew chiefly in Lower Egypt and could be adapted into a more economical writing medium – its pith was extracted and divided into thin pieces that were flattened under pressure and glued together. By adjoining other strips at right angles, papyrus rolls of any length could be produced. The relative cheapness of writing materials appears to be one of the factors contributing to the practice of writing itself becoming more widespread in Egypt than it did in Mesopotamia.

Egyptian papyrus was exported across the world, and became the subject of great demand. As a result, it became costly, and was replaced by other materials including leather and parchment. Paper was invented in China during the 2nd century AD, and is traditionally credited to Cai Lun. With the advent of wood-pulp paper in the 19th century, the cost of writing material began to steadily decline. While advancements in the mass production of paper throughout the 20th century improved the strength, ink retention, and other qualities of wood-pulp paper, it became one of the cheapest commodities in the global economy, resulting in its unprecedented availability as a writing medium as well as its widespread adoption for other applications.

== Uses and applications ==
=== Commerce ===
According to Denise Schmandt-Besserat, writing had its origins in the counting, cataloguing, and trade of agricultural produce. Government tax rolls followed thereafter. Written documents became essential for the accumulation and accounting of wealth by individuals, the state, and religious organizations as well as the transactions of trade, loans, inheritance, and documentation of ownership. With such documentation and accounting larger accumulations of wealth became more possible, along with the power that accompanied wealth, most prominently to the benefit of royalty, the state, and religions. Contracts and loans supported the growth of long-distance international trade with accompanying networks for import and export, supporting the rise of capitalism. Paper money was first used in China during the 11th century; it and other financial instruments relied on writing, initially in the form of letters and later as specialized genres designed to facilitate specific types of transactions and guarantees of value between individuals, banks, or governments. With the growth of economic activity in late Medieval and Renaissance Europe, sophisticated methods of accounting and calculating value emerged, with such calculations both carried out in writing and explained in manuals. The creation of corporations then proliferated documents surrounding organization, management, the distribution of shares, and records management.

During the late 18th century, François Quesnay and Adam Smith developed systematic theories of economics for the first time. The works of Quesnay, Smith, and their colleagues introduced the concept of an economy as such – as well as the concept of a national economy. Economics has since developed as a field with many authors contributing texts to the professional literature, and governments collecting data, instituting policies and creating institutions to manage and advance their economies. Deirdre McCloskey has examined the rhetorical strategies and discursive construction of modern economic theory. Graham Smart has examined in depth how the Bank of Canada uses writing to cooperatively produce policies based on economic data and then to communicate strategically with relevant publics.

=== Law, governance, and journalism ===
Private legal documents for the sale of land appeared in Mesopotamia in the early 3rd millennium BC, not long after the appearance of cuneiform writing. The first codes of law were written in Mesopotamia c. 2100 BC, exemplified in the Code of Hammurabi (c. 1750 BC) that was inscribed on stone stelae throughout the Old Babylonian Empire. While the ancient Egyptian state did not codify its laws, legal documents such as official decrees and private contracts were used during the Old Kingdom c. 2150 BC. The Torah, comprising the first five books of the Hebrew Bible, codified the laws of ancient Israel. Laws were frequently codified in ancient Greek and Roman polities, with Roman law ultimately serving as a model for both church canon law and secular law used throughout much of Europe during the Middle Ages.

In China, the earliest evidence for the codification of laws or punishments are bronze inscriptions made in 536 BC. The earliest law codes to be preserved in their entirety were those of the Qin and Western Han dynasties (221–9 BC), which articulated a full system of social control and governance, with criminal procedures and accountability for both government officials and citizens. These laws required complex reporting and documenting procedures to facilitate hierarchical supervision from the village up to the imperial centre.

While common law developed in a mostly oral environment in England after the Roman period, with the return of the church and the Norman Conquest, customary law began to be inscribed as were precedents of the courts; however, many elements remained oral, with documents only memorializing public oaths, wills, land transfers, court judgements, and ceremonies. During the late medieval period, however, documents gained authority for agreements, transactions, and laws.

Writing has been central to expanding many of the core functions of governance through law, regulation, taxation, and documentary surveillance of citizens; all dependent on growth of bureaucracy which elaborates and administers rules and policies and maintains records. These developments which rely on writing increase the power and extent of states. At the same time writing has increased the ability of citizens to become informed about the operations of the state, to become more organized in expressing needs and concerns, to identify with regions and states, and to form constituencies with particular views and interests; the history of journalism is closely linked to citizen information, regional and national identity, and expression of interests. These changes have greatly influenced the nature of states, increasing the visibility of people and their views no matter what the form of governance is.

In the ancient Near East and China, states developed extensive bureaucracies which relied on a literate class of scribes and bureaucrats. In the ancient Near East this was carried out through the formation of scribal schools; in China, this led to the institution of written imperial examinations based on classic texts that effectively defined traditional Chinese education for millennia. Literacy was associated with the government bureaucracy; following its emergence, printing was tightly controlled by the government, with texts written in vernacular Chinese being comparatively rare until the written vernacular Chinese movement that followed the end of the Qing dynasty (1644–1912). In ancient Greece and Rome, class distinctions between citizen and slave, wealthy and poor limited education and participation. During the Middle Ages and early modern period, the church dominated education in Europe, reflecting the central role religious life had in the maintenance of state power and bureaucracy.

In Europe and its American colonies, the introduction of the printing press and decreasing cost of paper and printing allowed for greater access of ordinary citizens to gain information about the government and conditions in other regions within the jurisdictions. The Reformation's emphasis on the individual reading of sacred texts eventually increased the spread of literacy beyond the ruling classes, and opened the door to a wider awareness and criticism of government policy. Growing divisions along confessional and political lines in English society during 16th and 17th centuries culminated in the English Civil War that resulted in the sovereignty of Parliament being prioritized over the prerogatives of the British monarchy. In this and other periods of conflict throughout the 16th and 17th centuries, cheap and disposable printed materials facilitated propaganda campaigns appealing to segments of the emerging public, pamphlet wars with authors attacking one another, and challenges to the status quo, often illicit, able to be published clandestinely.

Newspaper publishing and journalism, having origins in commercial information, soon was to offer political information and was instrumental to the formation of a public sphere. Newspapers were instrumental in the spread of information, fostering discussion and the formation of political identities in the American Revolution. During the late 19th century, the circulation of regional newspapers encouraged adoption and articulation of urban or localized identities by readers. A focus on national news that followed telegraphy and the emergence of newspapers with national circulation along with scripted national radio and television news broadcasts also created horizons of attention through the 20th century, with both benefits and costs.

== Literary culture ==
Much of what is considered knowledge is inscribed in written text and is the result of communal processes of production, sharing, and evaluation among social groups and institutions bound together with the aim of producing and disseminating knowledge-bearing texts; the contemporary world identifies such social groups as disciplines and their products as disciplinary literatures. The invention of writing facilitated the sharing, comparing, criticizing, and evaluating of texts, resulting in knowledge becoming a more communal property across wider geographic and temporal domains. Religious texts formed the common knowledge of scriptural religions, and knowledge of those sacred scriptures became the focus of institutions of religious belief, interpretation, and schooling.

Scholars have disagreed concerning when written record-keeping became more like literature, but the oldest surviving literary texts date from a full millennium after the invention of writing. The earliest literary author known by name is Enheduanna, who is credited as the author of a number of works of Sumerian literature, including Exaltation of Inanna, in the Sumerian language during the 24th century BC. The next earliest named author is Ptahhotep, who is credited with authoring The Maxims of Ptahhotep, an instructional book for young men in Old Egyptian composed in the 23rd century BC. The Epic of Gilgamesh is an early-2nd-millennium BC work of Akkadian epic poetry, which originally possibly served in some form to glorify a historical Gilgamesh who may have existed as a king in Sumer, recounting his natural and supernatural accomplishments.

The identification of sacred religious texts codified distinct belief systems, and became the basis of the modern concept of religion. The reproduction and spread of these texts became associated with these scriptural religions and their spread, and thus were central to proselytizing. Their status created expectations that believers either read or otherwise respect their contents; priests charged with reading, interpretation and application of texts were especially vital in societies prior to the advent of mass literacy.

=== Mesopotamia, Egypt, India, and Mesoamerica ===
In Mesopotamia and Egypt, scribes became important for roles beyond the initiating roles in the economy, governance and law. They became the producers and stewards of astronomy and calendars, divination, and literary culture. Schools developed in tablet houses, which also archived repositories of knowledge. In ancient India, the Brahman caste became stewards of texts that aggregated and codified oral knowledge. Those texts then became the authoritative basis for a continuing tradition of oral education. A case in point is the work of Pāṇini, a linguist who analysed and codified knowledge of Sanskrit syntax, prosody, and grammar. Mathematics, astronomy, and medicine were also subjects of classic Indian learning and were codified in classic texts. Less is known about Maya, Aztec, and other Mesoamerican learning because of the destruction of texts by the conquistadors, but it is known that scribes were revered, elite children attended schools, and the study of astronomy, map making, historical chronicles, and genealogy flourished.

=== China ===
In China, the Qin dynasty (221–206 BC) that unified the country wielded state power to marginalize the competing Confucian tradition. By contrast, the succeeding Han dynasty (202 BC – 220 AD) made philological knowledge the qualification for those in the government bureaucracy, so as to restore knowledge seen to be in danger of vanishing. A meritocratic imperial examination system was established to staff the civil service, and comprised a written exam based in large part around knowledge of the Confucian classics. To support students preparing for the imperial examinations, schools were established for studying the classics and the knowledge built up in the philological tradition surrounding them. These texts covered philosophical, religious, legal, astronomical, hydrological, mathematical, military, and medical knowledge.

Printing, as it emerged, largely served the knowledge needs of the bureaucracy and the monasteries, with substantial vernacular printing only emerging around the 15th century.

=== Classical Greece and Rome ===
Although Socrates (fl. 5th century BC) argued that writing was an inferior means of transmission of learning (recounted in the Phaedrus), his dialogues were preserved as written works authored by Plato. Havelock connects the philosophical work of Plato, Socrates, and Aristotle with literacy, as literacy enabled the development of critical thinking via the analysis of permanent texts written both by authors and by their peers. Aristotle wrote treatises and lectures which provided the core of education at the Lyceum, along with the many volumes collected in the Lyceum's library. The Stoics and Epicureans also wrote and taught during the same period in Athens, although their works survive only in fragments.

Greek writers founded many other fields of knowledge. Herodotus and Thucydides, who wrote in 5th-century BC Athens, are considered founders of the Western historiographical tradition, incorporating genealogy and mythic accounts into systematic investigations of events. Thucydides developed a more critical, neutral history through greater examination of documents, transcription of speeches, and interviews. During the same period, Hippocrates authored several works codifying contemporary knowledge within the field of medicine. The works of Galen, a Greek physician living in Rome during the 2nd century AD, were important in European medical practice through the Renaissance. Hellenized writers in Egypt produced compendia of knowledge using the resources of the Library of Alexandria, such as Euclid's Elements, which remains a standard reference work in geometry. Ptolemy's Almagest, an astronomy treatise, was used throughout the Middle Ages.

Roman scholars,including Varro, Pliny the Elder, and Strabo, continued the practice of writing compendia of knowledge. While much of Roman accomplishment was in material culture of construction, Vitruvius documented much of the contemporary practice to influence design until today. Agriculture also became an important area for manuals, such as Palladius's compendium. Numerous manuals of rhetoric and rhetorical education that were to influence future generations also appeared, such as the anonymous Rhetorica ad Herennium, Cicero's De Oratore and Quintilian's Institutio Oratoria.

=== Islamic world ===
Following the fall of the Western Roman Empire in the late 5th century, the Middle East became the crossroads for learning, with knowledge bearing texts from the West and East meeting in Constantinople, Damascus, and then Baghdad. The House of Wisdom founded during the Islamic Golden Age in Baghdad featured a large library where Greek works of medicine, philosophy, mathematics, and astronomy were translated into Arabic, along with Indian works on mathematics and therapeutics. To these texts, philosophers such as al-Kindi and Avicenna and astronomers such as al-Farghani made new contributions. Al-Khwarizmi authored the first work on algebra, drawing on both Greek and Indian resources. The centrality of the Quran within Islam also led to growth of Arabic linguistics. From Baghdad, knowledge and texts were to flow back to South Asia and down through Africa, with a large collection of books and an educational centre around the Sankoré Madrasah in Timbuktu, the seat of the Songhai Empire. During this period the deposed Umayyad Caliphate moved its seat of power and learning to Córdoba, now in Spain, where they founded a major library which reintroduced many of the classic texts back into Europe along with texts of Arab learning.

=== Medieval and early modern Europe ===
==== European manuscript culture ====
From the fall of Rome until the 11th century, the maintenance of manuscript culture in Western Europe – and intellectual life at-large – largely became the domain and responsibility of the Christian church. As one of their duties in the monastery, monks copied manuscripts – sometimes in dedicated rooms for writing known as scriptoria (sing. scriptorium).

==== Early European universities ====
The reintroduction of classical texts into Europe through the library and intercultural intellectual culture in Córdoba, including the classical Greek canon, as well as Arabic texts by Avicenna and al-Khwarizmi, created a need for interpretation and scholarship to make those works more accessible to scholars in monasteries and urban centres. During the 12th century, universities emerged from clusters of scholars in Italy at Bologna, in Spain at Salamanca, in France at Paris and in England at Oxford. By 1500, there were at least 60 universities throughout Europe enrolling at least 750,000 students. Each of the four faculties – liberal arts, theology, law, and medicine – was oriented around transmission of and commentary on classical texts, rather than the production of new knowledge. This form of scholastic education continued well into the 17th century in some locations and disciplines.

==== European print culture ====
The invention of the moveable type printing press by Johannes Gutenberg c. 1450 created new opportunities in Europe for the production and widespread distribution of books, fostered much new writing, and had particular consequences for the development of knowledge, as documented by Elizabeth Eisenstein. The production and distribution of knowledge was no longer tied to monasteries or universities with their libraries and collections of scribal copies. Over the ensuing centuries, no single authority in a politically and religiously divided Europe was able to censor or control the production of books. While universities remained dedicated to the dissemination of traditional texts, publishing houses became the new centres of knowledge production. With presses located in different jurisdictions leading to a greater diversity of ideas becoming available, and printed books able to move across borders, scholars came to see themselves as citizens of the Republic of Letters.

The comparison of multiple editions of traditional texts led to improved textual scholarship. The ability to share and compare results from many regions and enlist more people into the production of science soon led to the development of early modern science. Books of medicine began to incorporate observations from contemporary surgery and dissections, including printed plates providing illustrations, to improve knowledge of anatomy. With many copies of traditional books and new books appearing, debates arose over the value of each in what became known as the "battle of the books". Maps and discoveries of exploration and colonization also were recorded in books and governmental records, often with the purpose of economic exploitation as in the General Archive of the Indies in Seville but also to satisfy curiosity about the world.

Printing also made possible the invention and development of scientific journals, with the Journal des sçavans appearing in France and the Philosophical Transactions of the Royal Society in England, both in 1665. Over the years, these journals proliferated and became the basis of disciplines and disciplinary literature. Genres reporting experiments and other scientific observations and theories developed over the ensuing centuries to produce modern practices of disciplinary publication with the extensive intertexts which represent the collective pursuits of disciplinary knowledge. The availability of scientific and disciplinary books and journals also facilitated the development of modern practices of scientific reference and citation. These developments from the impact of printing on the growth of knowledge contributed to the Scientific Revolution, science in the Renaissance and during the Enlightenment.

=== Modern academia ===
In the 18th century, dissident Scottish and English universities began offering practical instruction in rhetoric and writing to enable non-elite students to influence contemporary events. Only in the 19th century did the universities in some countries begin making place for the writing of new knowledge, turning them in the ensuing years from primarily disseminating knowledge through the reading of classical texts to becoming institutions devoted to both reading and writing. The creation of research seminars and the associated seminar papers in history and philology in German universities were a significant starting point for the reform of the university. Professorships in philology, history, economy, theology, psychology, sociology, mathematics and the sciences were to emerge over the century, and the German model of disciplinary research university was to influence the organization of universities in England and the United States, with another model developing in France. Both emphasized production of new knowledge by faculty and acquisition thereof by students. In elite British universities, writing instruction was supported by the tutorial system with weekly writing by students for their tutors, while in the United States regular courses in writing were often required starting in the late 19th century, with writing across the curriculum becoming an increasing focus, particularly towards the end of the 20th century.

== Psychological implications ==
Walter J. Ong, Jack Goody, and Eric A. Havelock were among the earliest to systematically argue for the psychological and intellectual consequences of literacy. Ong argued that the introduction of writing changed the form of human consciousness from sensing the immediacy of the spoken word to the critical distance and systematization of words, which could be graphically displayed and ordered, such as in the works of Petrus Ramus. Havelock attributed the emergence of Greek philosophic thought to the use of the written word which allowed the comparison of beliefs and belief systems and the critical examination of concepts. Jack Goody argued that written language fostered such practices as categorization, making lists, following formulas, developing recipes and prescriptions, and ultimately making and recording experiments. These practices changed the intellectual and psychological orientation of those who engaged with them.

While recognizing the possibilities of all these psychological and intellectual changes that accompanied these literate practices, Sylvia Scribner and Michael Cole argued that these changes did not come universally or automatically with literacy, but rather were dependent on the social uses made of literacy in their local contexts. They carried out field observation and experiments among the Vai people of West Africa, for whom the psychological impacts of literacy vary due to the three different contexts in which locals learn to read and write the Vai language, English, and Arabic – practical skills, secular education, and religious education, respectively. European literacy was associated with European-style schooling, and fostered among other things syllogistic reasoning and logical problem solving. Arabic literacy was associated with the religious training of madrasas and fostered, among other things, heightened rote memory. Literacy in the written forms of Vai associated with daily practices of making requests and explaining tasks, increased anticipation of audience knowledge and needs along with rebus solving (as the written language used rebus-like icons).

== See also ==
- History of numbers
- History of art
- List of writing systems
- History of knowledge
- History of science
