= Sheri-Lynn Skwarchuk =

Canadian cognitive scientist

Sheri-Lynn Skwarchuk (born 1969) is a Canadian developmental psychologist specializing in early education, numeracy, and the cognitive science of mathematics. She is a professor of education and Director of Developmental Studies at the University of Winnipeg. She is also the head of ToyBox Manitoba, a project that aims to provide parents with tools to help their children learn about reading, mathematics, and health at home, and is the coauthor of a book about how to combat mathematical anxiety.

Skwarchuk has a bachelor's degree in psychology from the University of Winnipeg, and a master's degree and Ph.D. from the University of Waterloo. Her 1998 doctoral dissertation, Children's acquisition of the English cardinal number words, a special case of vocabulary development, was supervised by Jerry Anglin. She joined the University of Winnipeg Faculty of Education in 2003.
