= Jo-Anne LeFevre =

Canadian cognitive scientist

Jo-Anne LeFevre (born 1960) is a Canadian cognitive scientist specializing in numeracy and the cognitive science of mathematics. She is Chancellor's Professor of Cognitive Science and Psychology, and Director of the Institute of Cognitive Science at Carleton University. Her research has included the development of a test used to screen "tens of thousands of Canadian children" for risk of delayed mathematical development.

== Education and career ==
LeFevre was a student of psychology at the University of Alberta, where she earned a bachelor's degree in 1982, a master's degree in 1985, and a Ph.D. in 1988. Her dissertation, A differentiated-resource view of reading skill, was supervised by Peter Dixon.

She became an assistant professor at the University of Winnipeg in 1987, and moved to Carleton University in 1988, becoming associate professor in 1992, full professor in 1997, and Chancellor's Professor in 2015.

== Recognition ==
LeFevre is the 2018 recipient of the Mentorship Award of Women in Cognitive Science Canada, and the 2023 recipient of the Donald O. Hebb Distinguished Contribution Award of the Canadian Society for Brain, Behaviour and Cognitive Science.
