= Marion Bamford =

Zimbabwean paleobotanist

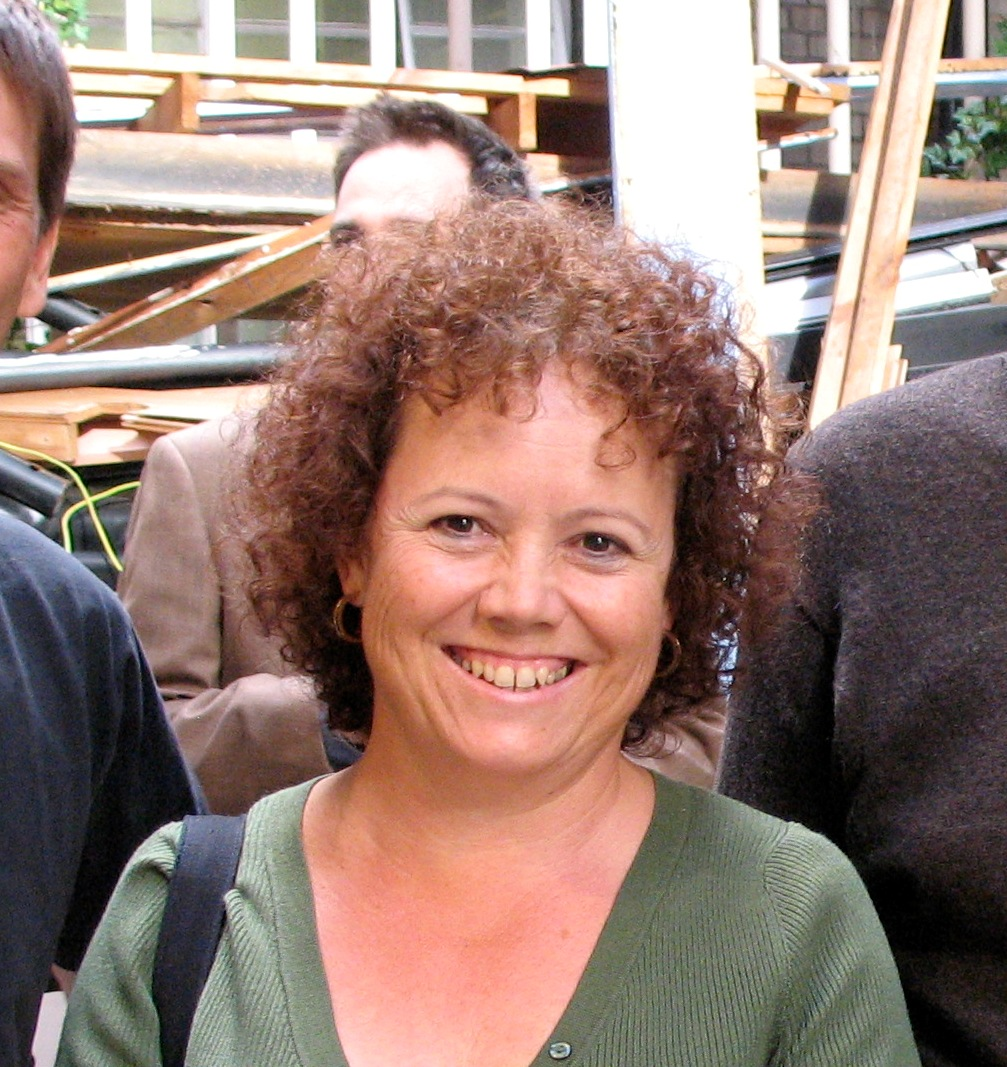
- Marion Bamford
- Education: University of the Witwatersrand
- Scientific career
- Fields: Paleobotany
- Workplaces: University of the Witwatersrand
- Thesis: The Angiosperm Palaeoflora From The Orapa Pipe, Botswana (1989)

Marion Kathaleen Bamford is a Zimbabwean paleobotanist, and is a professor at University of the Witwatersrand in Johannesburg, South Africa.

== Early life and education ==
Marion was born in Zimbabwe. She received her PhD, MSc, and BSc (Honors) at University of the Witwatersrand.

== Career ==
At the University of the Witwatersrand, she gives lectures about paleobotany to undergraduate students, and researches fossil woods, as well as leaf fossils, seed pollen, phytolith, and stems from the Permian period to the Holocene period. She has published more than 100 journal papers, and is a Fellow of The Royal Society of South Africa.

== See also ==
- University of the Witwatersrand
- Paleobotany
