= Pierre Amiet =

French archeologist and conservator (1922–2021)

- Born: 29 April 1922; Strasbourg, France
- Died: 20 April 2021 (aged 98); Paris, France
- Occupations: Archeologist, conservator

Pierre Amiet (29 April 1922 – 20 April 2021) was a French archeologist and conservator. He specialized in the Ancient Near East.

== Biography ==
Amiet's family left Alsace for Paris in 1939, and he studied at the École du Louvre and the Sorbonne. From 1950 to 1954, he participated in excavation campaigns in Tirzah. Upon his return from Samaria, he was married and later achieved his doctorate with a thesis titled La glyptique mésopotamienne archaïque. The thesis focused on iconographic evolution of the cylinder seal, and it was published in 1961.

Amiet was a conservator at the Musée des beaux-arts de Chambéry from 1958 to 1961 and later held the same role at the Department of Near Eastern Antiquities of the Louvre. After his time as a conservator, he taught at the École du Louvre, and served as Inspector General of Museum of France. He directed the Department of Eastern Antiquities at the Louvre from 1968 to 1988. He directed the journal Revue d’assyriologie et d’archéologie orientale until 2010.

Pierre Amiet died in Paris on 20 April 2021, at the age of 98.

== Publications ==
- L'Art d'Agadé au musée du Louvre (1976)
- L’Art antique du Moyen-Orient (1977)[6]
