= Early numeracy =

Branch of numeracy

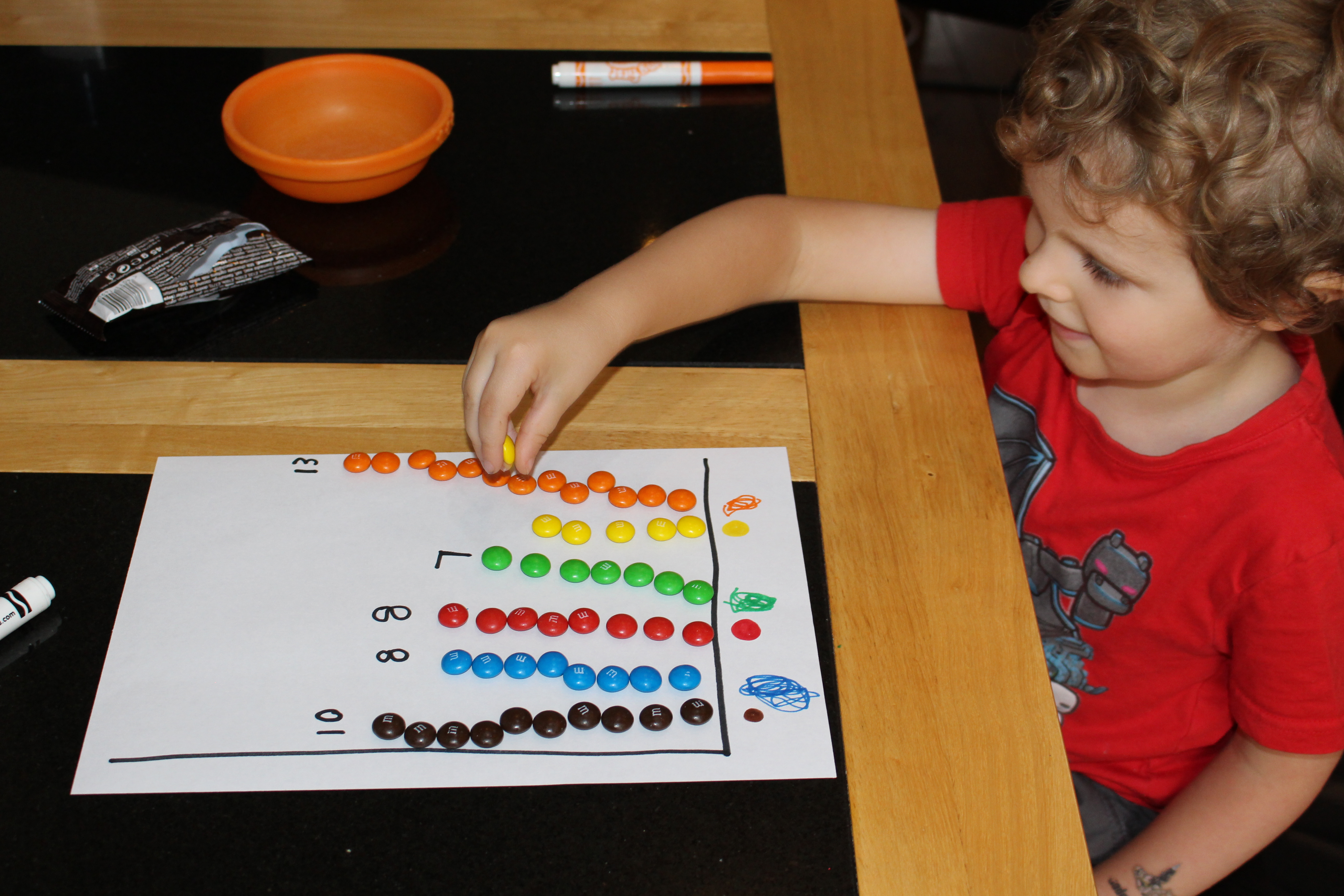
Child pairing numerals with equal numbers of sweets.

Early numeracy (also known as early mathematical literacy) refers to the mathematical abilities that children develop in their early years, before the age of five. It is part of the wider concept of numeracy, which refers to the ability to use simple mathematical concepts in everyday life. Early numeracy includes young children's ability to perceive and compare quantities without counting, through subitizing and approximation. Researchers disagree about how much these abilities contribute to later mathematical learning. By the time children start school, they differ markedly in their early numeracy skills, and these differences predict their later mathematics achievement. Assessing the level of early numeracy involves tasks such as asking children to hand over a requested number of objects, to say quickly how many dots are shown, or to judge which of two sets of dots is larger.

== Definition ==
Numeracy refers to the ability to understand, reason with, and apply simple mathematical concepts in everyday life. It is the numerical counterpart of literacy.

Early numeracy can be seen as a subset of numeracy, referring to the abilities which develop before the age of five and the start of formal schooling. Early mathematical literacy is a term which can be used interchangeably with early numeracy.

=== Related terms ===
Early mathematical skills are related to early numeracy but refer to abilities included directly in the (pre-)school curriculum, while early numeracy also covers the broader applications of mathematical concepts in everyday situations.

Number sense, a term popularized by Stanislas Dehaene, refers to the “ability to quickly understand, approximate, and manipulate numerical quantities”. In contrast to early numeracy, number sense includes abilities also found in non-human animals. Its definitions vary, and some researchers, especially in education, extend it even to symbolic calculations.

== Importance ==
Early numeracy develops rapidly between the ages of two and five, resulting in marked individual differences in mathematical skills by the time children start school. Children who enter school with high levels of numeracy skills tend to maintain this advantage. That is because of the nature of mathematics, where people must first master the basic skills to build an understanding of more complex concepts. Developing a solid foundation of early numerical skills is important because early numeracy predicts children’s mathematics achievement across development above and beyond domain-general skills (such as intelligence, executive functions and language skills), socioeconomic status, and teacher and classroom characteristics. Early numeracy predicts children’s early financial literacy skills as well.

== Key concepts and skills ==
=== Nonsymbolic quantity processing ===
An observer may be able to instantly judge how many red circles are present without counting them, but would find it harder to do so for the greater number of blue circles.

Researchers have proposed two independent cognitive systems for the language-independent numerical processing of nonsymbolic quantities such as arrays of dots or collections of objects. One, often referred to as the object tracking system (OTS), is thought to be responsible for small exact numerosity perception, known as subitizing. The other is responsible for the approximation of large nonsymbolic quantities, and is often called the approximate number system (ANS).

Subitizing is the name given to the fast enumeration of up to 4–5 items. Unlike in counting, there is little or no extra cost (in terms of response time) for each additional item during subitizing (e.g., it takes the same amount of time to enumerate two items as four).

In contrast to subitizing, the ANS can be used to process large quantities, although only approximately. For instance, it can be used to determine that there are more objects in a set of 40 red dots than in a set of 30 blue dots (a ratio of 4:3 or 1.33). Individuals vary in the ratio they can distinguish. The ANS develops with age, and older children can typically distinguish ratios closer to 1.

The role that these systems have in later numerical development is debated. For instance, there is some evidence that subitizing skills in 4–6-year-olds predict their later counting skills. However, there is also evidence that subitizing speed in 6–7-year-olds does not predict performance in other numerical tasks.

Some researchers have proposed that a child’s ANS acuity predicts their symbolic mathematics achievement at school. In line with this hypothesis, there is good evidence for a modest association between ANS acuity, measured with a dot comparison task, and symbolic mathematics performance. However, others have found that this relationship is primarily driven by non-numerical confounds, and some have suggested that methodological differences make comparisons between studies difficult. To date, there is limited evidence of a causal relationship between ANS acuity and symbolic mathematics achievement in children.

=== Counting ===
==== Reciting the counting list ====
From the age of two, children gradually learn the ordered sequence of number words. They initially learn a short part of the sequence and progressively extend it to larger numbers. At first, children may say “one, two, three, …” without necessarily understanding what individual number words mean. Through development, children learn the meaning of each number word.

==== Object counting ====
Learning to count involves more than memorising the counting list. It is important that children learn that, when counting, each object can be paired with only one number word. This is described as one-to-one correspondence. Some counting tasks require children to count a set of items instead of reciting the count sequence so they can learn how the counting sequence is used to represent the numerosity of a set.

Classic accounts of counting development identify several principles that allow the verbal count to provide information about how many items a set has. The stable-order principle states that number words must be recited in the established order. A child who produces number words in the wrong order (e.g., “one, two, four…”) cannot correctly identify the numerosity of the set. The one-to-one correspondence principle requires each object in a set to be associated with one, and only one, number word. When counting, a child must assign a different number word to each successive object without skipping or counting the same object twice. The cardinality principle states that the last recited number word represents the total number of objects in the set. The abstraction principle states that counting can be applied to any collection of discrete entities, including abstract concepts such as ideas or dreams. The order-irrelevance principle states that the order in which objects are counted does not alter the total.

An important question concerns how children acquire the meaning of individual number words. Evidence from the Give-a-number task suggests that young children gradually learn the exact meaning of number words.

=== Proportional reasoning ===
Children can not only work with absolute quantities, such as whole numbers, but can also work with relations between quantities, like proportional quantities, from an early age. Some researchers have highlighted the foundational role of proportional reasoning in students’ later understanding of rational numbers, such as fractions. However, this foundational role is still debated, and the evidence is mixed.

Although children can compare continuous quantities (for example the length of an object in comparison to its container) and discrete proportional quantities (like the proportions of shapes of different colors), these two abilities follow different developmental trajectories. Children’s ability to compare continuous quantities develops through early and middle childhood and reaches its maturity in early adulthood. In contrast, the ability to compare discrete proportions follows a more prolonged developmental trajectory. One reason for this slower process is children’s counting skills. When counting can provide a correct solution (e.g., comparing 1/2 with 3/4), children successfully compare discrete proportions between ages five and seven. However, when counting leads to incorrect solutions (for example choosing 7/9 over 6/7 because 7 is larger than 6 and 9 is larger than 7), children continue to struggle with these problems even at age 12.

=== Writing and reading numbers ===
Number writing and number reading require children to translate between spoken number words and written Hindu-Arabic numerals. This translation process is typically referred to as "number transcoding" in the scientific literature. Developmentally, children first learn to transcode single-digit numbers before they move on to two-digit and then larger numbers.

== Assessment ==
There are a variety of methods by which early numeracy can be measured. These include:

- Give-N (give-a-number) tasks for assessing "knower level" (which numbers children understand the meaning of). In a Give-N task, children are instructed to give a person a specific number of items, for example four pebbles. The largest number of objects the child is able to give when asked corresponds to the largest number word they understand. Children are cardinal principle knowers if they know the meaning of numbers 5 and above.
- Dot enumeration tasks, which measure subitizing. In these tasks, children have to say the number of dots presented to them as fast as possible.
- Dot comparison tasks, where children are presented with two sets of dots for a short time and need to decide which one contains more dots. This task measures the accuracy, or acuity, of a child’s ANS.

== See also ==
- Mathematics education
- Early childhood education
- Dyscalculia
- Mathematical anxiety
