= Numerical cognition =

Study of numerical and mathematical abilities

Numerical cognition is a subdiscipline of cognitive science that studies the cognitive, developmental and neural bases of numbers and mathematics. As with many cognitive science endeavors, this is a highly interdisciplinary topic, and includes researchers in cognitive psychology, developmental psychology, neuroscience and cognitive linguistics. This discipline, although it may interact with questions in the philosophy of mathematics, is primarily concerned with empirical questions.

Topics included in the domain of numerical cognition include:

- How do non-human animals process numerosity?
- How do infants acquire an understanding of numbers (and how much is inborn)?
- How do humans associate linguistic symbols with numerical quantities?
- How do these capacities underlie our ability to perform complex calculations?
- What are the neural bases of these abilities, both in humans and in non-humans?
- What metaphorical capacities and processes allow us to extend our numerical understanding into complex domains such as the concept of infinity, the infinitesimal or the concept of the limit in calculus?
- Heuristics in numerical cognition

== Comparative studies ==
A variety of research has demonstrated that non-human animals, including rats, lions and various species of primates have an approximate sense of number (referred to as "numerosity"). For example, when a rat is trained to press a bar 8 or 16 times to receive a food reward, the number of bar presses will approximate a Gaussian or Normal distribution with peak around 8 or 16 bar presses. When rats are more hungry, their bar-pressing behavior is more rapid, so by showing that the peak number of bar presses is the same for either well-fed or hungry rats, it is possible to disentangle time and number of bar presses. In addition, in a few species the parallel individuation system has been shown, for example in the case of guppies which successfully discriminated between 1 and 4 other individuals.

Similarly, researchers have set up hidden speakers in the African savannah to test natural (untrained) behavior in lions. These speakers can play a number of lion calls, from 1 to 5. If a single lioness hears, for example, three calls from unknown lions, she will leave, while if she is with four of her sisters, they will go and explore. This suggests that not only can lions tell when they are "outnumbered" but that they can do this on the basis of signals from different sensory modalities, suggesting that numerosity is a multisensory concept.

== Developmental studies ==
Researchers have proposed two independent cognitive systems in humans for the language-independent numerical processing of nonsymbolic quantities such as arrays of dots or collections of objects. One, often referred to as the object tracking system (OTS), is thought to be responsible for small exact numerosity perception, known as subitizing. The other is responsible for the approximation of large nonsymbolic quantities, and is often called the approximate number system (ANS).

Subitizing is the name given to the fast enumeration of up to 4–5 items. Unlike in counting, there is little or no extra cost (in terms of response time) for each additional item during subitizing (e.g., it takes the same amount of time to enumerate two items as four).

In contrast to subitizing, the ANS can be used to process large quantities, although only approximately. For instance, it can be used to determine that there are more objects in a set of 40 red dots than in a set of 30 blue dots (a ratio of 4:3 or 1.33). Individuals vary in the ratio they can distinguish. The ANS develops with age, and older children can typically distinguish ratios closer to 1.

The role that these systems have in later numerical development is debated. For instance, there is some evidence that subitizing skills in 4–6-year-olds predict their later counting skills. However, there is also evidence that subitizing speed in 6–7-year-olds does not predict performance in other numerical tasks.

Some researchers have proposed that a child’s ANS acuity predicts their symbolic mathematics achievement at school. In line with this hypothesis, there is good evidence for a modest association between ANS acuity, measured with a dot comparison task, and symbolic mathematics performance. However, others have found that this relationship is primarily driven by non-numerical confounds, and some have suggested that methodological differences make comparisons between studies difficult. To date, there is limited evidence of a causal relationship between ANS acuity and symbolic mathematics achievement in children.

== Neuroimaging and neurophysiological studies ==
Human neuroimaging studies have demonstrated that regions of the parietal lobe, including the intraparietal sulcus (IPS) and the inferior parietal lobule (IPL) are activated when subjects are asked to perform calculation tasks. Based on both human neuroimaging and neuropsychology, Stanislas Dehaene and colleagues have suggested that these two parietal structures play complementary roles. The IPS is thought to house the circuitry that is fundamentally involved in numerical estimation, number comparison, and on-line calculation, or quantity processing (often tested with subtraction) while the IPL is thought to be involved in rote memorization, such as multiplication. Thus, a patient with a lesion to the IPL may be able to subtract, but not multiply, and vice versa for a patient with a lesion to the IPS. In addition to these parietal regions, regions of the frontal lobe are also active in calculation tasks. These activations overlap with regions involved in language processing such as Broca's area and regions involved in working memory and attention. Additionally, the inferotemporal cortex is implicated in processing the numerical shapes and symbols, necessary for calculations with Arabic digits. More current research has highlighted the networks involved with multiplication and subtraction tasks. Multiplication is often learned through rote memorization and verbal repetitions, and neuroimaging studies have shown that multiplication uses a left lateralized network of the inferior frontal cortex and the superior-middle temporal gyri in addition to the IPL and IPS. Subtraction is taught more with quantity manipulation and strategy use, more reliant upon the right IPS and the posterior parietal lobule.

Single-unit neurophysiology in monkeys has also found neurons in the frontal cortex and in the intraparietal sulcus that respond to numbers. Andreas Nieder trained monkeys to perform a "delayed match-to-sample" task. For example, a monkey might be presented with a field of four dots, and is required to keep that in memory after the display is taken away. Then, after a delay period of several seconds, a second display is presented. If the number on the second display match that from the first, the monkey has to release a lever. If it is different, the monkey has to hold the lever. Neural activity recorded during the delay period showed that neurons in the intraparietal sulcus and the frontal cortex had a "preferred numerosity", exactly as predicted by behavioral studies. That is, a certain number might fire strongly for four, but less strongly for three or five, and even less for two or six. Thus, we say that these neurons were "tuned" for specific quantities. Note that these neuronal responses followed Weber's law, as has been demonstrated for other sensory dimensions, and consistent with the ratio dependence observed for non-human animals' and infants' numerical behavior.

While primates have remarkably similar brains to humans, there are differences in function, ability, and sophistication. They make for good preliminary test subjects, but do not show small differences that are the result of different evolutionary tracks and environment. However, in the realm of number, they share many similarities. As identified in monkeys, neurons selectively tuned to number were identified in the bilateral intraparietal sulci and prefrontal cortex in humans. Piazza and colleagues investigated this using fMRI, presenting participants with sets of dots where they either had to make same-different judgments or larger-smaller judgments. The sets of dots consisted of base numbers 16 and 32 dots with ratios in 1.25, 1.5, and 2. Deviant numbers were included in some trials in larger or smaller amounts than the base numbers. Participants displayed similar activation patterns as Nieder found in the monkeys. The intraparietal sulcus and the prefrontal cortex, also implicated in number, communicate in approximating number and it was found in both species that the parietal neurons of the IPS had short firing latencies, whereas the frontal neurons had longer firing latencies. This supports the notion that number is first processed in the IPS and, if needed, is then transferred to the associated frontal neurons in the prefrontal cortex for further numerations and applications. Humans displayed Gaussian curves in the tuning curves of approximate magnitude. This aligned with monkeys, displaying a similarly structured mechanism in both species with classic Gaussian curves relative to the increasingly deviant numbers with 16 and 32 as well as habituation. The results followed Weber's Law, with accuracy decreasing as the ratio between numbers became smaller. This supports the findings made by Nieder in macaque monkeys and shows definitive evidence for an approximate number logarithmic scale in humans.

With an established mechanism for approximating non-symbolic number in both humans and primates, a necessary further investigation is needed to determine if this mechanism is innate and present in children, which would suggest an inborn ability to process numerical stimuli much like humans are born ready to process language. Cantlon, Brannon, Carter & Pelphrey (2006) set out to investigate this in 4 year old healthy, normally developing children in parallel with adults. A similar task to Piazza's was used in this experiment, without the judgment tasks. Dot arrays of varying size and number were used, with 16 and 32 as the base numerosities. in each block, 232 stimuli were presented with 20 deviant numerosities of a 2.0 ratio both larger and smaller. For example, out of the 232 trials, 16 dots were presented in varying size and distance but 10 of those trials had 8 dots, and 10 of those trials had 32 dots, making up the 20 deviant stimuli. The same applied to the blocks with 32 as the base numerosity. To ensure the adults and children were attending to the stimuli, they put 3 fixation points throughout the trial where the participant had to move a joystick to move forward. Their findings indicated that the adults in the experiment had significant activation of the IPS when viewing the deviant number stimuli, aligning with what was previously found in the aforementioned paragraph. In the 4 year olds, they found significant activation of the IPS to the deviant number stimuli, resembling the activation found in adults. There were some differences in the activations, with adults displaying more robust bilateral activation, where the 4 year olds primarily showed activation in their right IPS and activated 112 less voxels than the adults. This suggests that at age 4, children have an established mechanism of neurons in the IPS tuned for processing non-symbolic numerosities. Other studies have gone deeper into this mechanism in children and discovered that children do also represent approximate numbers on a logarithmic scale, aligning with the claims made by Piazza in adults.

Izard, Sann, Spelke & Streri (2009) investigated abstract number representations in infants using a different paradigm than the previous researchers because of the nature and developmental stage of the infants. For infants, they examined abstract number with both auditory and visual stimuli with a looking-time paradigm. The sets used were 4vs.12, 8vs.16, and 4vs.8. The auditory stimuli consisted of tones in different frequencies with a set number of tones, with some deviant trials where the tones were shorter but more numerous or longer and less numerous to account for duration and its potential confounds. After the auditory stimuli was presented with 2 minutes of familiarization, the visual stimuli was presented with a congruent or incongruent array of colorful dots with facial features. they remained on the screen until the infant looked away. They found that infants looked longer at the stimuli that matched the auditory tones, suggesting that the system for approximating non-symbolic number, even across modalities, is present in infancy. What is important to note across these three particular human studies on nonsymbolic numerosities is that it is present in infancy and develops over the lifetime. The honing of their approximation and number sense abilities as indicated by the improving Weber fractions across time, and usage of the left IPS to provide a wider berth for processing of computations and enumerations lend support for the claims that are made for a nonsymbolic number processing mechanism in human brains.

== Relations between number and other cognitive processes ==
There is evidence that numerical cognition is intimately related to other aspects of thought – particularly spatial cognition. One line of evidence comes from studies performed on number-form synaesthetes. Such individuals report that numbers are mentally represented with a particular spatial layout; others experience numbers as perceivable objects that can be visually manipulated to facilitate calculation. Behavioral studies further reinforce the connection between numerical and spatial cognition. For instance, participants respond quicker to larger numbers if they are responding on the right side of space, and quicker to smaller numbers when on the left –the so-called "Spatial-Numerical Association of Response Codes", or SNARC effect. This effect varies across culture and context, however, and some research has even begun to question whether the SNARC reflects an inherent number-space association, instead invoking strategic problem solving or a more general cognitive mechanism like conceptual metaphor. Moreover, neuroimaging studies reveal that the association between number and space also shows up in brain activity. Regions of the parietal cortex, for instance, show shared activation for both spatial and numerical processing. These various lines of research suggest a strong, but flexible, connection between numerical and spatial cognition.

Modification of the usual decimal representation was advocated by John Colson. The sense of complementation, missing in the usual decimal system, is expressed by signed-digit representation.

== Heuristics in numerical cognition ==
Several consumer psychologists have also studied the heuristics that people use in numerical cognition. For example, Thomas & Morwitz (2009) reviewed several studies showing that the three heuristics that manifest in many everyday judgments and decisions – anchoring, representativeness, and availability – also influence numerical cognition. They identify the manifestations of these heuristics in numerical cognition as: the left-digit anchoring effect, the precision effect, and the ease of computation effect respectively. The left-digit effect refers to the observation that people tend to incorrectly judge the difference between $4.00 and $2.99 to be larger than that between $4.01 and $3.00 because of anchoring on left-most digits. The precision effect reflects the influence of the representativeness of digit patterns on magnitude judgments. Larger magnitudes are usually rounded and therefore have many zeros, whereas smaller magnitudes are usually expressed as precise numbers; so relying on the representativeness of digit patterns can make people incorrectly judge a price of $391,534 to be more attractive than a price of $390,000. The ease of computation effect shows that magnitude judgments are based not only on the output of a mental computation, but also on its experienced ease or difficulty. Usually it is easier to compare two dissimilar magnitudes than two similar magnitudes; overuse of this heuristic can make people incorrectly judge the difference to be larger for pairs with easier computations, e.g. $5.00 minus $4.00, than for pairs with difficult computations, e.g. $4.97 minus $3.96.

== Ethnolinguistic variance ==
The numeracy of indigenous peoples is studied to identify universal aspects of numerical cognition in humans. Notable examples include the Pirahã people who have no words for specific numbers and the Munduruku people who only have number words up to five. Pirahã adults are unable to mark an exact number of tallies for a pile of nuts containing fewer than ten items. Anthropologist Napoleon Chagnon spent several decades studying the Yanomami in the field. He concluded that they have no need for counting in their everyday lives. Their hunters keep track of individual arrows with the same mental faculties that they use to recognize their family members. There are no known hunter-gatherer cultures that have a counting system in their language. The mental and lingual capabilities for numeracy are tied to the development of agriculture and with it large numbers of indistinguishable items.

== Research outlet ==
The Journal of Numerical Cognition is an open-access, free-to-publish, online-only journal outlet specifically for research in the domain of numerical cognition.

== See also ==
- Addition – Arithmetic operation
- Approximate number system – Innate ability to detect differences in magnitude without counting
- Counting – Finding the number of elements of a finite set
- Estimation – Process of finding an approximation
- Numerosity adaptation effect – Phenomenon in numerical cognition
- Ordinal numerical competence
- Parallel individuation system – Cognitive system for number sense
- Plant arithmetic – Form of plant intelligence
- The problem of the speckled hen – Type of epistemological problem
- Subitizing – Perception of object number without counting
- Subtraction – One of the four basic arithmetic operations
