= Number sense in animals =

Number sense in animals is the ability of creatures to represent and discriminate quantities of relative sizes by number sense. It has been observed in various species, from fish to primates. Animals are believed to have an approximate number system, the same system for number representation demonstrated by humans, which is more precise for smaller quantities and less so for larger values. An exact representation of numbers higher than three has not been attested in wild animals, but can be demonstrated after a period of training in captive animals.

In order to distinguish number sense in animals from the symbolic and verbal number system in humans, researchers use the term numerosity, rather than number, to refer to the concept that supports approximate estimation but does not support an exact representation of number quality.

Number sense in animals includes the recognition and comparison of number quantities. Some numerical operations, such as addition, have been demonstrated in many species, including rats and great apes. Representing fractions and fraction addition has been observed in chimpanzees. A wide range of species with an approximate number system suggests an early evolutionary origin of this mechanism or multiple convergent evolution events. Like humans, chicks have a left-to-right mental number line (they associate the left space with smaller numbers and the right space with larger numbers).

== Early studies ==
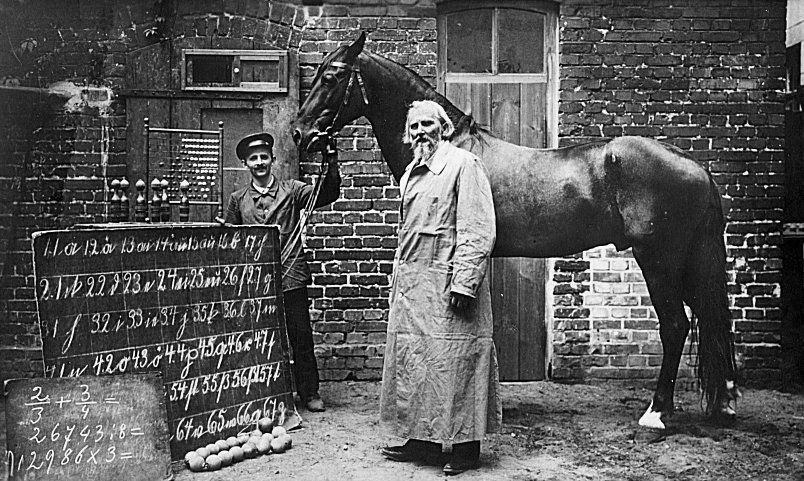
Wilhelm von Osten and Clever Hans

At the beginning of the 20th century, Wilhelm von Osten famously, but prematurely, claimed human-like counting abilities in animals on the example of his horse named Hans. His claim is widely rejected today, as it is attributed to a methodological fallacy, which received the name Clever Hans phenomenon after this case. Von Osten claimed that his horse could perform arithmetic operations presented to the horse in writing or verbally, upon which the horse would knock on the ground with its hoof the number of times that corresponded to the answer. This apparent ability was demonstrated numerous times in the presence of the horse's owner and a wider audience, and was also observed when the owner was absent. However, upon a rigorous investigation by Oskar Pfungst in the first decade of 20th century, Hans' ability was shown to be not arithmetic in nature, but to be the ability to interpret minimal unconscious changes in body language of people when the correct answer was approaching. Today, the arithmetic abilities of Clever Hans are commonly rejected and the case serves as a reminder to the scientific community about the necessity of rigorous control for experimenter expectation in experiments.

There were, however, other early and more reliable studies on number sense in animals. A prominent example is the work of Otto Koehler, who conducted a number of studies on number sense in animals between 1920s and 1970s. In one of his studies he showed that a raven named Jacob could reliably distinguish the number 5 across different tasks. This study was remarkable in that Koehler provided a systematic control condition in his experiment, which allowed him to test the number ability of the raven separately from the ability of the raven to encode other features, such as size and location of the objects. However, Koehler's work was largely overlooked in the English-speaking world, due to the limited availability of his publications, which were in German and only partially published during World War II.

The experimental setup for the study of numerical cognition in animals was further enriched by the work of Mechner and Platt and Johnson. In their experiments, the researchers deprived rats of food and then taught them to press a lever a specific number of times to obtain food. The rats learned to press the lever approximately the number of times specified by the researchers. Additionally, the researchers showed that rats' behavior was dependent on the number of required presses, and not for example on the time of pressing, as they varied the experiment to include faster and slower behavior on the rat's part by controlling how hungry the animal was.

== Methodology ==
Examining the representation of numerosity in animals is a challenging task, since it is not possible to use language as a medium. Because of this, carefully designed experimental setups are required to differentiate between numerical abilities and other phenomena, such as the Clever Hans phenomenon, memorization of the single objects or perception of object size and time. Also, these abilities are seen only from the past few decades and not from the time of evolution.

One of the ways that numerical ability is thought to be demonstrated is the transfer of the concept of numerosity across modalities. This was for example the case in the experiment of Church and Meck, in which rats learned to "add" the number of light flashes to the number of tones to find out the number of expected lever presses, showing a concept of numerosity independent of visual and auditory modalities.

Modern studies in number sense in animals try to control for other possible explanations of animal behavior by establishing control conditions in which the other explanations are tested. For example, when the number sense is investigated on the example of apple pieces, an alternative explanation is tested that assumes that the animal represents the volume of apple rather than a number of apple pieces. To test this alternative, an additional condition is introduced in which the volume of the apple varies and is occasionally smaller in the condition with a greater number of pieces. If the animal prefers a bigger number of pieces also in this condition, the alternative explanation is rejected, and the claim of numerical ability supported.

== Approximate number and parallel individuation systems ==
Numerosity is believed to be represented by two separate systems in animals, similarly to humans. The first system is the approximate number system, an imprecise system used for estimations of quantities. This system is distinguished by distance and magnitude effects, which means that a comparison between numbers is easier and more precise when the distance between them is smaller and when the values of the numbers are smaller. The second system for representing numerosities is the parallel individuation system, which supports the exact representation of numbers from one to four. In addition, humans can represent numbers through symbolic systems, such as language.

The distinction between the approximate number system and the parallel individuation system is, however, still disputed, and some experiments record behavior that can be fully explained with the approximate number system, without the need to assume another separate system for smaller numbers. For example, New Zealand robins repeatedly selected larger quantities of cached food with a precision that correlated with the total number of cache pieces. However, there was no significant discontinuity in their performance between small (1 to 4) and larger (above 4) sets, which would be predicted by the parallel individuation system. On the other hand, other experiments only report knowledge of numbers up to 4, supporting the existence of the parallel individuation system and not the approximate number system.

== In primates ==
Studies have shown that primates share similar cognitive algorithms for not only comparing numerical values, but also encoding those values as analogs. In fact, many experiments have supported that primates' capacity for numbers is comparable to human children. Through these experiments, it is clear that there are several neurological processing mechanisms at work— the approximate number system (ANS), number ordinality, the parallel individuation system (PNS), and subitization.

=== Approximate number system ===
The approximate number system (ANS) is fairly imprecise and relies heavily on cognitive estimation and comparison. This system does not give numbers individual value, but compares quantities based on their relative size. The efficiency of this ANS depends on Weber's law, which states that the ability to distinguish between quantities is dictated by the ratio between two numbers, not the absolute difference between them. In other words, the accuracy of the ANS depends on the size difference between two quantities being compared. And since larger quantities are more difficult to comprehend than smaller quantities, the accuracy of ANS also decreases as numerosity increases.

It has been found that rhesus macaques (Macaca mulatta), when given certain images of objects with multiple properties i.e. colors, shapes, and numbers, are quick to match the image with another of the same number of items regardless of the other properties. This result supports the use of the ANS because the monkeys aren't defining numbers individually, but are rather matching sets of items of the same number using comparison of quantities. The tendency of macaques to categorize and equate groups of items by number is extremely suggestive of a functioning ANS in primates.

Examples of the ANS in primates exist during natural confrontation within and between groups. In the case of chimpanzees (Pan troglodytes), an intruder on a group's territory will only be attacked if the intruder is alone and the attacking party is composed of at least three males— a ratio of one-to-three. Here, they are using ANS by way of comparative analysis of the invading group and their own group to determine whether or not to attack. This social numerical superiority concept exists across many primate species and displays the understanding of power in numbers, at least in a comparative way.

Further evidence of the ANS has been found in chimpanzees successfully identifying different quantities of food in a container. The chimpanzees listened to items of food that they were unable to see be thrown individually into separate containers. Then, they chose which container to eat from (based on which contained the higher amount of food). They were fairly successful with the task, indicating that the chimps had the capability to not only compare quantities, but also to keep track of those quantities within their minds. The experiment did however break down at certain similar numbers of individual food items according to Weber's Law.

=== Ordinality ===
The number skill most thoroughly supported in primates is ordinality – the ability to recognize sequential symbols or quantities. Rather than merely determining if a value is greater or less than another like the ANS, ordinality requires a more nuanced recognition of the specific order of numbers or items in a set. Here, Weber's Law is no longer applicable since the values are only increasing incrementally, often by only one.

Primates have displayed ordinality both with arrays of items, as well as with Arabic numerals. When presented with arrays of 1-4 items, rhesus macaques were capable of consistently touching the arrays in ascending order. After this test, they were presented with arrays containing higher numbers of items and were able to extrapolate the task by touching the new arrays also in ascending sequential order. Moreover, the rate at which the monkeys performed the task was comparable to human adults.

Primates can also recognize sequences when given only Arabic numerals. One experiment known colloquially as the "chimp challenge" this task involved teaching chimpanzees to memorize the correct order of Arabic numerals from 1-9 then to press them in that order once they've disappeared scattered on a screen. Not only could the chimps recognize the correct sequence of the scattered numbers, but also recall the correct sequence after the numbers had disappeared on the screen. Furthermore, they were able to do this faster and more accurately than human adults. Without being provided with visual representation of the quantity that the number represented, this task signified a more advanced cognitive ability— differentiating symbols based on how they relate to each other in a series.

=== Parallel individuation system ===
The parallel individuation system (PIS) is the most difficult number processing system to find evidence for in primates. This is because it requires the understanding that each number is a symbolic representation of a unique quantity that can be manipulated mathematically in a distinct way. The PIS unlike the ANS, is therefore independent of the need for comparison, allowing each number to exist on its own with a value defined by arithmetic. In order to use the PIS, one must have some understanding of numerals—specific symbolic representations of quantities that relate to other symbolic representations of quantities in definite ways. For example, the "chimp challenge" only displayed primates' understanding that three exists before four and after two, not that three can act on its own and independently hold a consistent value.

Often, the experimental set up required to support the existence of the PIS is lengthy. Once a primate has been trained on a task long enough to display the PIS, the results are usually attributed to mere associative learning rather than exact number comprehension. In order to provide unequivocal evidence of the existence of the PIS in primates, researchers must find a situation where a primate performs some sort of arithmetic calculation in the wild.

However, the closest researchers have come to successfully supporting the PIS in primates is in Rhesus macaques. In this study, the macaques were proven to associate auditory stimuli of a certain number of individual vocalizations with the correct number of individuals. While this didn't require them to learn Arabic numerals, it required the ability to choose an exact quantity for the voice number they heard rather than merely comparing quantities by sight or within a sequence.

=== Subitization ===
Another important phenomenon to consider regarding primates understanding of numbers is subitization. Subitization is a phenomenon where the brain automatically groups small numbers of objects together visually without requiring it to go through any explicit mental counting of the objects. In humans, subitization allows for the recognition of numbers on pairs of dice due to the dot groupings rather than explicitly counting each dot. Essentially, it can give one a number sense without needing to understand the numerical system at low quantities.

Subitization in primates is evident in a wide range of experiments. Rhesus monkeys have been proven to differentiate between numbers of apples in a container even when the sizes of the apple slices were manipulated (some larger but fewer slices). While this could be attributed to PIS, the act of comparing groupings of small numbers suggests subitization is likely at play, especially because the experiment broke down once the numbers reached above about four.

== In other taxons ==
=== Fish ===
An approximate number system has been found in a number of fish species, such as guppies, green swordtails and mosquitofish. For example, preference for a bigger social group in mosquitofish was exploited to test the ability of the fish to discriminate numerosity. The fish successfully discriminated between different amounts up to three, after which they could discriminate groups if the difference between them also increased so that the ratio of the two groups was one-to-two. Similarly, guppies discriminated between values up to four, after which they only detected differences when the ratio between the two quantities was one-to-two.

=== Rats ===
Rats have demonstrated behavior consistent with an approximate number system in experiments where they had to learn to press a lever a specified number of times to obtain food. While they did learn to press the lever the amount specified by the researchers, between four and sixteen, their behavior was approximate, proportional to the number of lever presses expected from them. This means that for the target number of four, the rats' responses varied from three to seven, and for the target number of 16 the responses varied from 12 to 24, showing a much greater interval. This is compatible with the approximate number system and magnitude and distance effects.

=== Birds ===
Birds were one of the first animal species tested on their number sense. A raven named Jacob was able to distinguish the number 5 across different tasks in the experiments by Otto Koehler. Later experiments supported the claim of existence of a number sense in birds, with Alex, a grey parrot, able to label and comprehend labels for sets with up to six elements. Other studies suggest that pigeons can also represent numbers up to 6 after an extensive training.

=== Dogs ===
A sense of number has also been found in dogs. For example, dogs were able to perform simple additions of two objects, as revealed by their surprise when the result was incorrect. It is however argued that wolves perform better on quantity discrimination tasks than dogs and that this could be a result of a less demanding natural selection for number sense in dogs.

=== Ants ===
Ants were shown to be able to count up to 20 and add and subtract numbers within 5. In highly social species such as red wood ants scouting individuals can transfer to foragers the information about the number of branches of a special "counting maze" they had to go to in order to obtain syrup. The findings concerning number sense in ants are based on comparisons of duration of information contacts between scouts and foragers which preceded successful trips by the foraging teams. Similar to some archaic human languages, the length of the code of a given number in ants' communication is proportional to its value. In experiments in which the bait appeared on different branches with different frequencies, the ants used simple additions and subtractions to optimize their messages.

=== Wild rodents ===
Striped field mice (Apodemus agrarius) demonstrated a sense of number consistent with precise relative-quantity judgment: some of these mice exhibit high accuracy in discriminating between quantities that differ only by one. The latter include both small (such as 2 versus 3) and relatively large (such as 5 versus 6, and 8 versus 9) quantities of elements.

=== Bees ===
Bees can count up to four objects encountered sequentially during flight. In a 2017 study, bees seemed to navigate to food sources by maintaining a running count of prominent landmarks passed en route, effective up to four landmarks.

== See also ==
- Number sense in plants
- Ordinal numerical competence § In non-humans
- Quorum sensing
