= Number sense =

Intuitive grasp of numbers

In psychology, number sense is the term used for the hypothesis that some animals, particularly humans, have a biologically determined ability that allows them to represent and manipulate large numerical quantities. The term was popularized by Stanislas Dehaene in his 1997 book "The Number Sense," but originally named by the mathematician Tobias Dantzig in his 1930 text Number: The Language of Science.

Psychologists believe that the number sense in humans can be differentiated into the approximate number system, a system that supports the estimation of the magnitude, and the parallel individuation system, which allows the tracking of individual objects, typically for quantities below 4.

There are also some differences in how number sense is defined in math cognition. For example, Gersten and Chard say number sense "refers to a child's fluidity and flexibility with numbers, the sense of what numbers mean and an ability to perform mental mathematics and to look at the world and make comparisons."

In non-human animals, number sense is not the ability to count, but the ability to perceive changes in the number of things in a collection. All mammals, and most birds, will notice if there is a change in the number of their young nearby. Many birds can distinguish two from three.

Researchers consider number sense to be of prime importance for children in early elementary education, and the National Council of Teachers of Mathematics has made number sense a focus area of pre-K through 2nd grade mathematics education. An active area of research is to create and test teaching strategies to develop children's number sense. Number sense also refers to the contest hosted by the University Interscholastic League. This contest is a ten-minute test where contestants solve math problems mentally—no calculators, scratch-work, or mark-outs are allowed.

== Concepts involved in number sense ==
The term number sense involves several concepts of magnitude, ranking, comparison, measurement, rounding, percents, and estimation, including:

- estimating with large numbers to provide reasonable approximations;
- judging the degree of precision appropriate to a situation;
- understanding the hidden meaning of numbers through analytical and critical thinking (e.g., Freakonomics);
- rounding (understanding reasons for rounding large numbers and limitations in comparisons);
- choosing measurement units to make sense for a given situation;
- solving real-life problems involving percentages and decimal portions;
- comparing physical measurements within and between the U.S. and metric systems; and
- comparing degrees Fahrenheit and Celsius in real-life situations.

Those concepts are taught in elementary-level education.

== See also ==
- Approximate number system – Innate ability to detect differences in magnitude without counting
- Mental calculation – Arithmetical calculations using only the human brain
- Number sense in animals
- Numeracy, innumeracy – Ability to apply numerical concepts
- Numerosity adaptation effect – Phenomenon in numerical cognition
- Order of magnitude – Scale of numbers with a fixed ratio
- Ordinal numerical competence – ability to count objects in order and to understand the greater than and less than relationships between numbers
- Parallel individuation system – non-symbolic cognitive system that supports the representation of numerical values from zero to three or four
- Numerals and grammatical number of the Pirahã language – Muran language
- Plant arithmetic – Form of plant intelligence
- Subitizing – Assessing the quantity of objects in a visual scene without individually counting each item
