= Dyscalculia =

Disorder affecting learning arithmetic

- Other names: Specific learning disorder with impairment in mathematics
- Pronunciation: /ˌdɪskælˈkjuːliə/
- Specialty: Neurology, psychiatry
- Symptoms: Difficulty learning or comprehending mathematics
- Complications: Difficulty with daily tasks
- Duration: Lifelong

Dyscalculia is a learning disorder, resulting in difficulty learning or comprehending arithmetic, such as difficulty in understanding numbers, numeracy, learning how to manipulate numbers, performing mathematical calculations, and learning facts in mathematics. In the United Kingdom it is classified as a specific learning difficulty. It is sometimes colloquially referred to as "math dyslexia."

Dyscalculia is associated with dysfunction in the region around the intraparietal sulcus, and potentially also the frontal lobe. Dyscalculia does not reflect a general deficit in cognitive abilities or difficulties with time, measurement, and spatial reasoning. Estimates of the prevalence of dyscalculia range between three and six percent of the population.

In 2015, it was established that 11% of children with dyscalculia also have attention deficit hyperactivity disorder (ADHD). Dyscalculia has also been associated with Turner syndrome, Down syndrome, and people who have spina bifida.

== Signs and symptoms ==
The earliest appearance of dyscalculia is typically a deficit in subitizing, which is the ability to know, from a brief glance and without counting, how many objects there are in a small group. Children as young as five can subitize six objects, especially while looking at the dots on the sides of dice; however, children with dyscalculia can subitize fewer objects and, even when correct, take longer to identify the number than their age-matched peers.

Dyscalculia often looks different at different ages. It tends to become more apparent as children get older; however, symptoms can appear as early as preschool. Common symptoms of dyscalculia are having difficulty with mental calculation, trouble analyzing time and reading an analog clock, struggle with motor sequencing that involves numbers, and often counting on fingers when adding numbers.

=== Persistence in children ===
Although many researchers believe dyscalculia to be a persistent disorder, evidence on the persistence of dyscalculia remains mixed. For instance, in a study done by Mazzocco and Myers (2003), researchers evaluated children on a slew of measures and selected their most consistent measure as their best diagnostic criterion: a stringent 10th-percentile cut-off on the TEMA-2. Even with their best criterion, they found dyscalculia diagnoses for children longitudinally did not persist; only 65% of students who were ever diagnosed over the course of four years were diagnosed for at least two years. The percentage of children who were diagnosed in two consecutive years was further reduced. It is unclear whether this was the result of misdiagnosed children improving in mathematics and spatial awareness as they progressed as normal, or that the subjects who showed improvement were accurately diagnosed, but exhibited signs of a non-persistent learning disability.

=== Persistence in adults ===
There are very few studies of adults with dyscalculia who have had a history of it growing up, but such studies have shown that it can persist into adulthood. It can affect major parts of an adult's life. Most adults with dyscalculia have a hard time processing mathematics at a 4th-grade level. For 1st–4th grade level, many adults will know what to do for the mathematics problem, but they will often get them wrong because of "careless errors", although they are not careless when it comes to the problem.

The adults cannot process their errors on the problems or may not even recognize that they have made these errors. Visual-spatial input, auditory input, and touch input will be affected due to these processing errors. Dyscalculics may experience difficulties when adding numbers in a column format. Their mind can mix up the numbers, and it is possible that they may get the same (wrong) answer twice due to their mind processing the problem incorrectly. Dyscalculics can have problems determining differences in different coins and their size or giving the correct amount of change and if numbers are grouped together, it is possible that they cannot determine which has less or more.

Dyscalculics are slower and make more mistakes when asked to choose the greater of two numbers, especially when those numbers are close together. Research has also documented impaired visuo-spatial statistical learning in adults with dyscalculia. Adults with dyscalculia may struggle with directions while driving and with controlling their finances, leading to difficulties on a day-to-day basis.

==== College students or other adult learners ====
College students particularly may have a difficult time due to the fast pace and change in difficulty of the work they are given. As a result of this, students may develop much anxiety and frustration. After dealing with their anxiety for a long time, students can become averse to mathematics and try to avoid it as much as possible, which may result in lower grades in mathematics courses. Students with dyscalculia, however, can also do exceptionally well in writing, reading, and speaking.

== Causes ==
Both domain-general and domain-specific causes have been put forth. With respect to pure developmental dyscalculia, domain-general causes are unlikely as they should not impair one's ability in the numerical domain without also affecting other domains such as reading. In favor of domain-general theories, some studies suggested that some other cognitive functions as spatial skills, face perception and general working memory could be a predictor of dyscalculia and comorbid dyslexia/dyscalculia. Two competing domain-specific hypotheses about the causes of developmental dyscalculia have been proposed – the magnitude representation (or number module deficit hypothesis) and the access deficit hypothesis.

=== Magnitude representation deficit ===
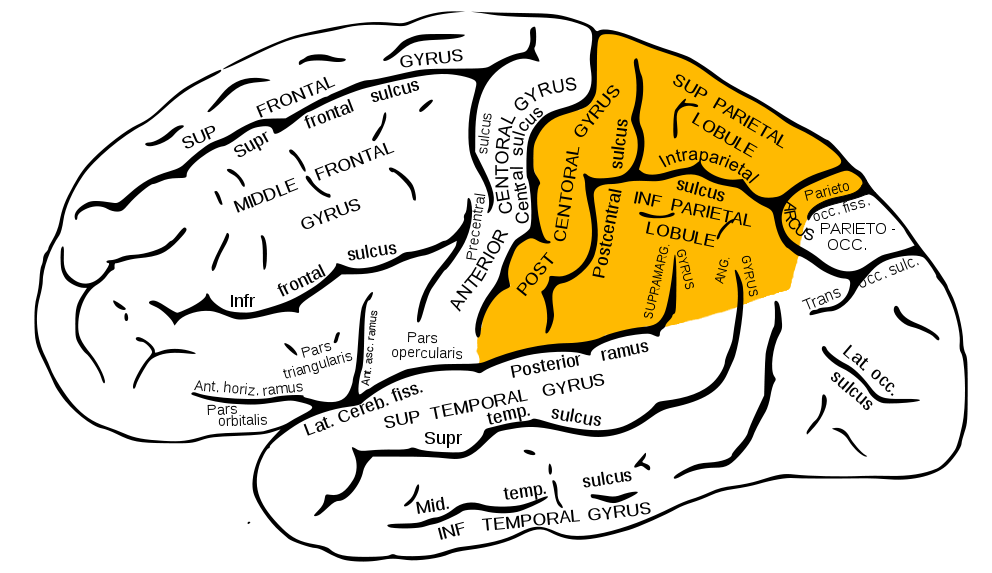
The part of the brain where the sulcus is located in the parietal lobe.

Dehaene's "number sense" theory suggests that approximate numerosities are automatically ordered in an ascending manner on a mental number line. The mechanism to represent and process non-symbolic magnitude (e.g., number of dots) is often known as the "approximate number system" (ANS), and a core deficit in the precision of the ANS, known as the "magnitude representation hypothesis" or "number module deficit hypothesis", has been proposed as an underlying cause of developmental dyscalculia.

In particular, the structural features of the ANS are theoretically supported by a phenomenon called the "numerical distance effect", which has been robustly observed in numerical comparison tasks. Typically developing individuals are less accurate and slower in comparing pairs of numbers closer together (e.g., 7 and 8) than further apart (e.g., 2 and 9). A related "numerical ratio effect" (in which the ratio between two numbers varies but the distance is kept constant, e.g., 2 vs. 5 and 4 vs. 7) based on Weber's law has also been used to further support the structure of the ANS.

The numerical ratio effect is observed when individuals are less accurate and slower in comparing pairs of numbers that have a larger ratio (e.g., 8 and 9, ratio = 8/9) than a smaller ratio (2 and 3; ratio = 2/3). A larger numerical distance or ratio effect with comparison of sets of objects (i.e., non-symbolic) is thought to reflect a less precise ANS, and ANS acuity has been found to correlate with mathematical achievement in typically developing children, as well as in adults.

More importantly, several behavioral studies have found that children with developmental dyscalculia show an attenuated distance/ratio effect compared with typically developing children. Neuroimaging studies have provided additional insights even when behavioral difference in distance/ratio effect might not be clearly evident. For example, Gavin R. Price and colleagues found that children with developmental dyscalculia showed no differential distance effect on reaction time relative to typically developing children, but they did show a greater effect of distance on response accuracy.

They also found that the right intraparietal sulcus in children with developmental dyscalculia was not modulated to the same extent in response to non-symbolic numerical processing as in typically developing children. With the robust implication of the intraparietal sulcus in magnitude representation, it is possible that children with developmental dyscalculia have a weak magnitude representation in the parietal region. It does not rule out an impaired ability to access and manipulate numerical quantities from their symbolic representations (e.g., Arabic digits).

Findings from a cross-sectional study suggest that children with developmental dyscalculia might have a delayed development in their numerical magnitude representation by as much as five years. The lack of longitudinal studies still leaves the question open as to whether the deficient numerical magnitude representation is a delayed development or impairment.

=== Access deficit hypothesis ===
Rousselle & Noël propose that dyscalculia is caused by the inability to map preexisting representations of numerical magnitude onto symbolic Arabic digits. Evidence for this hypothesis is based on research studies that have found that individuals with dyscalculia are proficient on tasks that measure knowledge of non-symbolic numerical magnitude (i.e., non-symbolic comparison tasks) but show an impaired ability to process symbolic representations of number (i.e., symbolic comparison tasks).

Neuroimaging studies also report increased activation in the right intraparietal sulcus during tasks that measure symbolic but not non-symbolic processing of numerical magnitude. However, support for the access deficit hypothesis is not consistent across research studies.

== Diagnosis ==
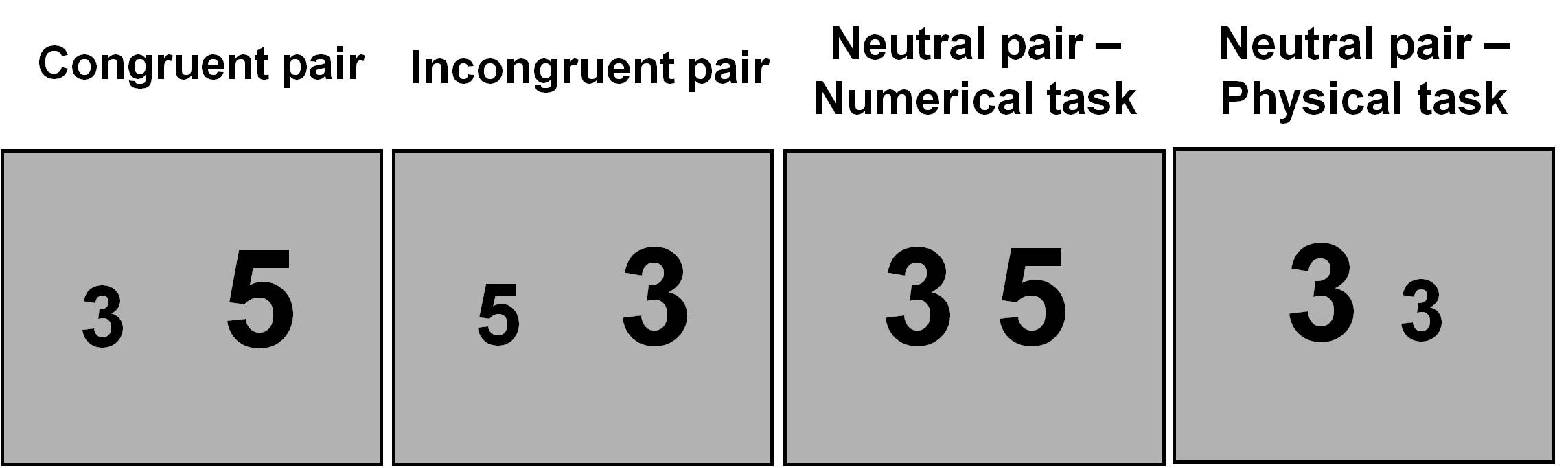
The example of each condition in the numerical Stroop effect task

At its most basic level, dyscalculia is a learning disability affecting the normal development of arithmetic skills. A consensus has not yet been reached on appropriate diagnostic criteria for dyscalculia. Mathematics is a specific domain that is complex (i.e. includes many different processes, such as arithmetic, algebra, word problems, geometry, etc.) and cumulative (i.e. the processes build on each other such that mastery of an advanced skill requires mastery of many basic skills).

Thus dyscalculia can be diagnosed using different criteria, and frequently is. This variety in diagnostic criteria leads to variability in identified samples, and thus variability in research findings regarding dyscalculia.

Other than using achievement tests as diagnostic criteria, researchers often rely on domain-specific tests (i.e. tests of working memory, executive function, inhibition, intelligence, etc.) and teacher evaluations to create a more comprehensive diagnosis. Alternatively, fMRI research has shown that the brains of the children not affected can be reliably distinguished from the brains of the dyscalculic children based on the activation in the prefrontal cortex. Due to the cost and time limitations associated with brain and neural research, these methods would likely not be incorporated into diagnostic criteria despite their effectiveness.

=== Types ===
Research on subtypes of dyscalculia has begun without consensus; preliminary research has focused on comorbid learning disorders as subtyping candidates. The most common comorbidity in individuals with dyscalculia is dyslexia. Most studies done with comorbid samples versus dyscalculic-only samples have shown different mechanisms at work and additive effects of comorbidity, indicating that such subtyping may not be helpful in diagnosing dyscalculia. But there is variability in results at present.

Due to high comorbidity with other disabilities such as dyslexia, or ADHD, some researchers have suggested the possibility of subtypes of mathematical disabilities with different underlying profiles and causes. Whether a particular subtype is specifically termed "dyscalculia" as opposed to a more general mathematical learning disability is somewhat under debate in the scientific literature.

- Semantic memory: This subtype often coexists with reading disabilities such as dyslexia and is characterized by poor representation and retrieval from long-term memory. These processes share a common neural pathway in the left angular gyrus, which has been shown to be selective in arithmetic fact retrieval strategies, as well as symbolic magnitude judgments. This region also shows low functional connectivity with language-related areas during phonological processing in adults with dyslexia. Thus, disruption to the left angular gyrus can cause both reading impairments and difficulties in calculation. This has been observed in individuals with Gerstmann syndrome, of which dyscalculia is one of constellation of symptoms.
- Procedural concepts: Research by Geary has shown that in addition to increased problems with fact retrieval, children with mathematical disabilities may rely on immature computational strategies. Specifically, children with mathematical disabilities showed poor command of counting strategies unrelated to their ability to retrieve numeric facts. This research notes that it is difficult to discern whether poor conceptual knowledge is indicative of a qualitative deficit in number processing or simply a delay in typical mathematical development.
- Working memory: Studies have found that children with dyscalculia showed impaired performance on working memory tasks compared to non affected children. Furthermore, research has shown that children with dyscalculia have weaker activation of the intraparietal sulcus during visuospatial working memory tasks. Brain activity in this region during such tasks has been linked to overall arithmetic performance, indicating that numerical and working memory functions may converge in the intraparietal sulcus; however, working memory problems are confounded with domain-general learning difficulties, thus these deficits may not be specific to dyscalculia but rather may reflect a greater learning deficit. Dysfunction in prefrontal regions may also lead to deficits in working memory and other executive function, accounting for comorbidity with ADHD.

Although evidence is not yet concrete, studies have shown indications of causes due to congenital or hereditary disorders.

== Treatment ==
To date, very few interventions have been developed specifically for individuals with dyscalculia. Concrete manipulation activities have been used for decades to train basic number concepts for remediation purposes. This method facilitates the intrinsic relationship between a goal, the learner's action, and the informational feedback on the action. A one-to-one tutoring paradigm designed by Lynn Fuchs and colleagues which teaches concepts in arithmetic, number concepts, counting, and number families using games, flash cards, and manipulables has proven successful in children with generalized math learning difficulties, but intervention has yet to be tested specifically on children with dyscalculia.

These methods require specially trained teachers working directly with small groups or individual students. As such, instruction time in the classroom is necessarily limited. For this reason, several research groups have developed computer adaptive training programs designed to target deficits unique to dyscalculic individuals.

Software intended to remediate dyscalculia has been developed. While computer adaptive training programs are modeled after one-to-one type interventions, they provide several advantages. Most notably, individuals are able to practice more with a digital intervention than is typically possible with a class or teacher. As with one-to-one interventions, several digital interventions have also proven successful in children with generalized math learning difficulties. Räsänen and colleagues have found that games such as The Number Race and Graphogame-math can improve performance on number comparison tasks in children with generalized math learning difficulties.

Several digital interventions have been developed for dyscalculics specifically. Each attempts to target basic processes that are associated with maths difficulties. Rescue Calcularis was one early computerized intervention that sought to improve the integrity of and access to the mental number line. Other digital interventions for dyscalculia adapt games, flash cards, and manipulables to function through technology. While each intervention claims to improve basic numerosity skills, the authors of these interventions do admit that repetition and practice effects may be a factor involved in reported performance gains.

An additional criticism is that these digital interventions lack the option to manipulate numerical quantities. While the previous two games provide the correct answer, the individual using the intervention cannot actively determine, through manipulation, what the correct answer should be. Butterworth and colleagues argued that games like The Number Bonds, which allows an individual to compare different sized rods, should be the direction that digital interventions move toward. Such games use manipulation activities to provide intrinsic motivation toward content guided by dyscalculia research. One of these serious games is Meister Cody – Talasia, an online training that includes the CODY Assessment – a diagnostic test for detecting dyscalculia. Based on these findings, Dybuster Calcularis was extended by adaptation algorithms and game forms allowing manipulation by the learners. It was found to improve addition, subtraction and number line tasks, and was made available as Dybuster Calcularis.

A study used transcranial direct current stimulation (tDCS) to the parietal lobe during numerical learning and demonstrated selective improvement of numerical abilities that was still present six months later in typically developing individuals. Improvement were achieved by applying anodal current to the right parietal lobe and cathodal current to the left parietal lobe and contrasting it with the reverse setup. When the same research group used tDCS in a training study with two dyscalculic individuals, the reverse setup (left anodal, right cathodal) demonstrated improvement of numerical abilities.

== Epidemiology ==
Dyscalculia is thought to be present in 3–6% of the general population, but estimates by country and sample vary somewhat. Many studies have found prevalence rates by gender to be equivalent. Those that find gender difference in prevalence rates often find dyscalculia higher in females, but some few studies have found prevalence rates higher in males.

== History ==
The term dyscalculia was coined in the 1940s, but it was not completely recognized until 1974 by the work of Slovak researcher Ladislav Košč. Košč defined dyscalculia as "a structural disorder of mathematical abilities". His research proved that the learning disability was caused by impairments to certain parts of the brain that control mathematical calculations and not because symptomatic individuals were "mentally handicapped". Researchers now sometimes use the terms "math dyslexia" or "math learning disability" when they mention the condition.

Cognitive disabilities specific to mathematics were originally identified in case studies with patients who experienced specific arithmetic disabilities as a result of damage to specific regions of the brain. More commonly, dyscalculia occurs developmentally as a genetically linked learning disability which affects a person's ability to understand, remember, or manipulate numbers or number facts (e.g., the multiplication tables). The term is often used to refer specifically to the inability to perform arithmetic operations, but is also defined by some educational professionals and cognitive psychologists such as Stanislas Dehaene, or Brian Butterworth, as a more fundamental inability to conceptualize numbers as abstract concepts of comparative quantities (a deficit in "number sense"), which these researchers consider to be a foundational skill upon which other mathematics abilities build.

Symptoms of dyscalculia include the delay of simple counting, inability to memorize simple arithmetic facts such as adding, subtracting, etc. There are few known symptoms because little research has been done on the topic.

== Etymology ==
The term dyscalculia dates back to at least 1949. Dyscalculia comes from Greek and Latin and means "counting badly". The prefix dys- comes from Greek and means "badly". The root calculia comes from the Latin calculare, which means "to count"; it is also a cognate of calculation and calculus.

== See also ==
- Acalculia – Acquired difficulty with simple maths
- Approximate number system – Innate ability to detect differences in magnitude without counting
- Diagnostic and Statistical Manual of Mental Disorders – American psychiatric classification
- Dysgraphia – Neurological disorder of written expression
- Dyslexia – Learning disability affecting reading
- Hypercalculia – Specific developmental condition involving superior mathematical ability
- Mathematical anxiety – Anxiety towards math
- Nonverbal learning disorder – Neurodevelopmental disorder
- Number sense – Intuitive grasp of numbers
- Numerical cognition – Study of numerical and mathematical abilities
- Numerophobia – Fear of numbers or mathematics
