= Graph literacy =

Graph literacy is the ability to understand information that presented graphically, which are including general knowledge about how to extract information and make inferences from different graphical formats. Although related, graph literacy is distinct from other forms of literacy (e.g., general health literacy or numeracy) in the sense that it relates more specifically to one's ability to obtain meaning from information presented graphically. It can include the storage of mental representations in long-term memory, knowledge about the properties of different types of formats, and procedures to interpret them. However, similar to other types of literacy, higher graph literacy is associated with higher education levels and suggests that developing the skills required to interpret graphical information requires knowledge that is acquired through formal education and experience.

Graph literacy is very important in everyday life: graphs appear throughout the published media, in newspapers and magazines, on TV and on the internet, and are used to provide information for many important decisions including medical, nutritional, financial and political choices. Yet many people can have difficulty understanding even the simplest graphs. Up to one third of the general population lacks the skills needed to understand basic numerical formats (e.g., percentages or ratios) and basic graphic displays (such as bar or pie charts, line graphs, or icon arrays). While graphical displays can improve understanding and comprehension of quantitative information, such as the risks and benefits of medical treatments, they may not be helpful for everyone. Visual displays may be of greater help to people with low numeracy whereas numbers may be better for people who have poor graph literacy. Determining what type of information displays lead to better comprehension of information, and for whom, is an ongoing topic of research, particularly within the area of risk communication.

== Graph comprehension ==
Graphical displays can contain a vast amount of information such as information contained within the title, labels and axes, but also within features of the display (e.g., size, spacing, patterns in the data) that can vary in their complexity (e.g., multiple variables). Both perceptual and cognitive processes are required to interpret the information contained within a graphic display. Different processes are required to extract information depending on the task or goal, such as extracting a specific value or making inferences based on the data (e.g., predicting future trends). Graph comprehension depends not only on people's knowledge, familiarity or experience with reading graphic displays but also on the way in which the graphic is designed. For example, some features of graphs make use of spatial-to-conceptual mappings that are grounded in our everyday experience, such as the tendency for higher bars to relate to greater or larger quantities. However, other aspects need to be learned, such as arbitrary graph conventions (e.g., axis labels and scales). Graph literacy can affect how people attend to and encode some of these features.

== Graph literacy scale ==
The Graph Literacy Scale consists of 13 items and measures three abilities related to graph comprehension (see) (1) the ability to read the data, that is, to find specific information in the graph; (2) the ability to read between the data, that is, to find relationships in the data as shown on the graph; and (3) the ability to read beyond the data, or make inferences and predictions from the data. The scale was validated in a survey conducted on probabilistic national samples in Germany and the USA. Previous measures of graph comprehension have tended to focus on the comprehension of specific features or types of graphs (e.g., line or bar graphs), incorporate relatively complex items, or have been developed in the context of examining the effects of teaching methods on the acquisition of graph skills (e.g.,). Some numeracy scales include a few items related to the comprehension of graphical information but these are limited in their ability to measure a range of graphs, features, or tasks.
