= Iansyst =

Technology company

iansyst Limited
- Type: Private
- Founded: 1983; 43 years ago
- Headquarters: Cambridge, UK
- Services: Assistive technology
- Website: www.iansyst.co.uk/dsa/

iansyst Ltd is an assistive technology supplier providing products and services designed to benefit people with a range of disabilities such as: dyslexia, visual impairments, dyscalculia, developmental coordination disorder, Repetitive Strain Injury.

== History ==
The company was founded in London in early 1983 by Ian Litterick, primarily to supply software for training and education.

By 1995, now based in Cambridge, iansyst was distributing the monologue Text to Speech Synthesis software, which was considered useful by people with dyslexia.

In 1996, iansyst became involved with the framework of the DSA-QAG (the Disabled Students’ Allowance Quality Assurance Group), as well as becoming a supplier of assistive technology and training for students who have received the Disabled Students Allowance (DSA) Award. Founder, Ian Litterick has been an active member of the Right to Read Campaign which was launched in 2002.

During 2009/2010 iansyst partnered with XMA to deliver the Home Access initiative from the Government to supply children with severe disabilities or Special Educational Needs, of low income families with the Home Access package of a computer, internet access and assistive technology. The partnership between iansyst and education experts XMA was recognised when they won the Working Together Award in 2012 from Technology4Good. These unique awards were organised by AbilityNet and BT and brought together a range of charities and businesses whose work enables people to improve their lives through the use of IT.

In early 2012 iansyst was awarded funding by Jisc TechDis via the Plain Sailing Competition to develop MyDocStore. This was done in partnership with a consortium of organisations led by iansyst: they include Raspberry Software and ECS – Electronics and Computer Science from the University of Southampton. The aim of MyDocStore is to make it quick and easy to transfer files between devices whilst simultaneously converting them into an accessible format for the user; i.e. text to audio, text to large format and combinations of both. In 2013 the project was launched as the web service azzapt.

== Staff ==
Executive Chairman, Ian Litterick is a founder member of BATA British Assistive Technology Association. BATA campaigns for the rights and interests of those needing Assistive Technology.

Managing Director, Janine King leads iansyst's support as Members of the Business Disability Forum (BDF).
