= SNARC =

SNARC may refer to:

- Smallest Named And Registered Clade
- Spatial-numerical association of response codes
- Stochastic Neural Analog Reinforcement Calculator, an early neural network implementation
