= Hypercalculia =

Specific developmental condition involving superior mathematical ability

Hypercalculia is a specific developmental condition characterized by a mathematical calculation ability that is significantly superior to the individual's general learning ability and school attainment in mathematics. It is often associated with autism spectrum disorder (ASD) and savant syndrome. Neuroimaging studies have suggested biological correlates for the condition; for instance, a 2002 neuroimaging study of a child with hypercalculia observed greater brain volume in the right temporal lobe. Serial SPECT scans have also indicated hyperperfusion over right parietal areas during the performance of arithmetic tasks.

== Characteristics and prevalence ==
Hypercalculia is considered a form of savant ability. While children may demonstrate strength in either language or mathematics, the co-occurrence of exceptional abilities in both is rare. However, case studies have documented individuals exhibiting hypercalculia alongside hyperlexia (precocious reading ability) and hypermnesia (exceptional memory).

Research into the achievement profiles of children with autism spectrum disorders (ASD) has identified distinct academic patterns. A 2014 study of children aged 6–9 with ASD found four achievement profiles: higher-achieving (39%), hyperlexia (9%), hypercalculia (20%), and lower-achieving (32%). Earlier research from 2009 estimated the prevalence of hypercalculia among adolescents with ASD at approximately 16.2%. Despite these findings, hypercalculia can be overlooked in academic settings, potentially due to a greater focus on hyperlexia or varied testing outcomes that range from average proficiency to the 99th percentile on standardized measures.

== Mechanisms and cognition ==
The underlying causes of hypercalculia and other savant skills remain a subject of scientific debate. Some researchers hypothesize that obsessive tendencies inherent in ASD may drive individuals to focus intense attention on specific areas, such as calendars, numbers, or counting. Others suggest that savant abilities utilize distinct neural processes or working memory capacities compared to neurotypical cognition.

In terms of cognitive strategies, individuals with hypercalculia may employ segmentation or "chunking" methods to process information. For example, some "prime number savants" identify prime numbers by systematically deconstructing integers into smaller components to determine divisibility.

== Terminology and history ==
The classification of savant abilities has evolved since the 19th century. In 1887, Dr. John Langdon Down coined the term "idiot savant" to describe individuals with low IQ scores (typically below 25) who nevertheless exhibited specific giftedness in areas such as arithmetic or music. This term is now considered obsolete and pejorative. The term "autistic savant" was subsequently used, though it is not universally applicable, as approximately half of those with savant syndrome have central nervous system conditions other than autism. "Savant syndrome" is currently the preferred terminology.

== Diagnosis and education ==
Hypercalculia is often identified in the context of broader autism assessments. Under the DSM-IV criteria, relevant diagnoses included autistic disorder, Asperger disorder, and pervasive developmental disorder not otherwise specified (PDD-NOS). Behavioral studies of clinically referred children have noted that those with high intellectual performance on the spectrum may still exhibit social withdrawal similar to those with lower intellectual performance.

Educational awareness of savant abilities increased in the late 20th century. However, the rarity of conditions like hypercalculia can make it difficult to implement specialized educational resources. Educators must often address a disconnect between a student's calculation speed and their ability to apply those skills in practical contexts.

== See also ==
- Acalculia
- Dyscalculia
- Mental calculator
- Numerical cognition
- Savant syndrome
