= John Allen Paulos =

American mathematician and author (born 1945)

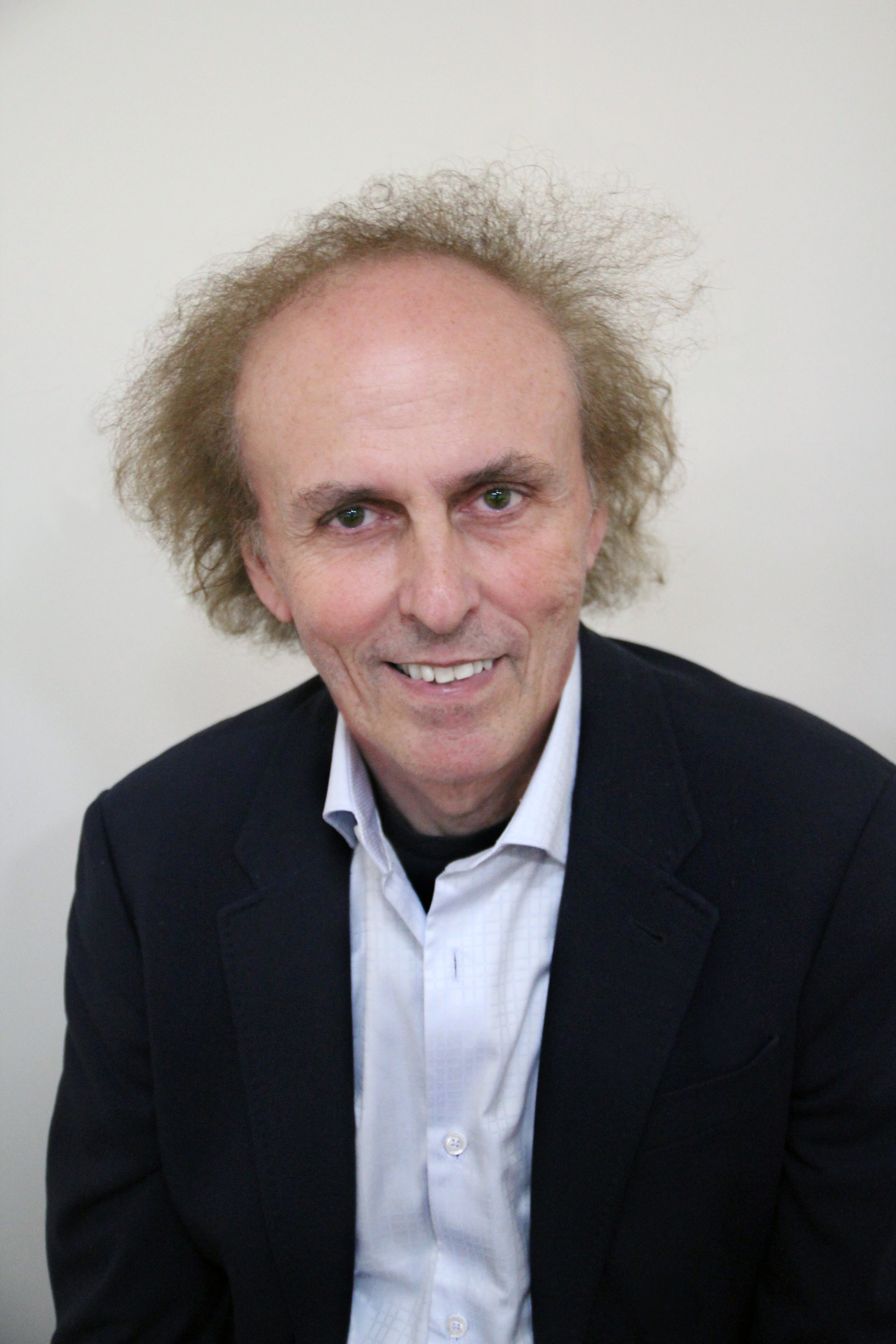
- Born: July 4, 1945 (age 81)
- Education: University of Wisconsin–Madison
- Known for: Author of books and articles on a variety of topics, especially the combatting of innumeracy
- Awards: In 2003 AAAS Award, in 2013 JPBM Award
- Scientific career
- Fields: Mathematics
- Workplaces: Temple University
- Thesis: Truth Adequancy and Truth Maximality for Logics
- Doctoral advisor: Jon Barwise
- The voice of John Allen Paulos recorded July 2015 at TAM13
- Website: johnallenpaulos.com

John Allen Paulos (born July 4, 1945) is an American professor of mathematics at Temple University in Philadelphia, Pennsylvania, a writer and speaker on mathematics and the importance of mathematical literacy. He writes about the dangers of mathematical innumeracy, ie the layperson's misconceptions about numbers, probability, and logic.

== Early life ==
Paulos was born in Denver, Colorado and grew up in Chicago, Illinois and Milwaukee, Wisconsin, where he attended high school. After his Bachelor of Mathematics at University of Wisconsin (1967) and his Master of Science at University of Washington (1968), he received his PhD in mathematics from the University of Wisconsin–Madison (1974). In an interview he described himself as lifelong skeptic. He volunteered for the Peace Corps in the seventies.

== Career ==
Mathematics is no more computation than literature is typing.

— John Allen Paulos, Innumeracy

The most amazing coincidence of all would be the complete absence of all coincidences.

— John Allen Paulos, "Irreligion"

Uncertainty is the only certainty there is, and knowing how to live with insecurity is the only security.

— John Allen Paulos, "A Mathematician Plays the Market"

His academic work is mainly in mathematical logic and probability theory.

His book Innumeracy: Mathematical Illiteracy and its Consequences (1988) was a bestseller and A Mathematician Reads the Newspaper (1995) extended the critique. In his books Paulos discusses innumeracy with quirky anecdotes, scenarios and facts, encouraging readers in the end to look at their world in a more quantitative way.

He has also written on other subjects often "combining disparate disciplines", such as the mathematical and philosophical basis of humor in Mathematics and Humor and I Think, Therefore I Laugh, the stock market in A Mathematician Plays the Stock Market, quantitative aspects of narrative in Once Upon a Number, the arguments for God in Irreligion, and most recently "bringing mathematics to bear on...biography" in A Numerate Life.

Paulos also wrote a mathematics-tinged column for the UK newspaper The Guardian and is a Committee for Skeptical Inquiry fellow.

Paulos has appeared frequently on radio and television, including a four-part BBC adaptation of A Mathematician Reads the Newspaper and appearances on the Lehrer News Hour, 20/20, Larry King, and David Letterman.

In 2001 Paulos taught a course on quantitative literacy for journalists at the Columbia University School of Journalism. The course stimulated further programs at Columbia and elsewhere in precision and data-driven journalism.

His long-running "ABCNews.com" monthly column Who's Counting deals with mathematical aspects of stories in the news. All the columns over a 10- year period are archived here.

== Private life ==
He is married, father of two, grandfather of four.

== Awards ==
- 2013: JPBM (Joint Policy Board for Mathematics) Award for communicating mathematics on a sustained basis to large audiences
- 2003: AAAS (American Association for the Advancement of Science) Award for promoting the public understanding of science and technology
- 2002: University Creativity Award at Temple University
- 1994: Folio Award for the article Counting on Dyscalculia which appeared in Discover Magazine in 1994

== Works ==
- Mathematics & Humor: A Study of the Logic of Humor. University Of Chicago. 1980. ISBN 978-0-226-65024-1.
- I Think Therefore I Laugh: The Flip Side of Philosophy. Columbia University Press. 1985. ISBN 978-0-231-06031-8.
- Innumeracy: Mathematical Illiteracy and its Consequences. Hill and Wang. 1988. ISBN 978-0-670-83008-4.
- Beyond Numeracy: Ruminations of a Numbers Man. Knopf. 1991. ISBN 978-0-394-58640-3.
- A Mathematician Reads the Newspaper. Basic Books. 1995. ISBN 978-0-465-04362-0.
- Once Upon a Number: The Hidden Mathematical Logic of Stories. Basic Books. 1998. ISBN 978-0-465-05158-8.
- A Mathematician Plays the Stock Market. Basic Books. 2003. ISBN 978-0-465-05480-0. (British edition titled A Mathematician Plays the Market)
- Irreligion: A Mathematician Explains Why the Arguments for God Just Don't Add Up. Hill and Wang. 2007. ISBN 978-0-8090-5919-5.
- A Numerate Life - A Mathematician Explores the Vagaries of Life, His Own and probably Yours. Prometheus Books. 2015. ISBN 978-1-63388-118-1.
- Potpourri of Writings
- "He Conquered the Conjecture", essay by Paulos on Grigory Perelman from The New York Review of Books
- Metric Mania
- Measuring Bacteria With a Yardstick
- Romantic Crushes and Bayes Theorem
- Stories vs. Statistics, NYT Opinionator piece
