= Ellen Peters (professor) =

Science Communication researcher

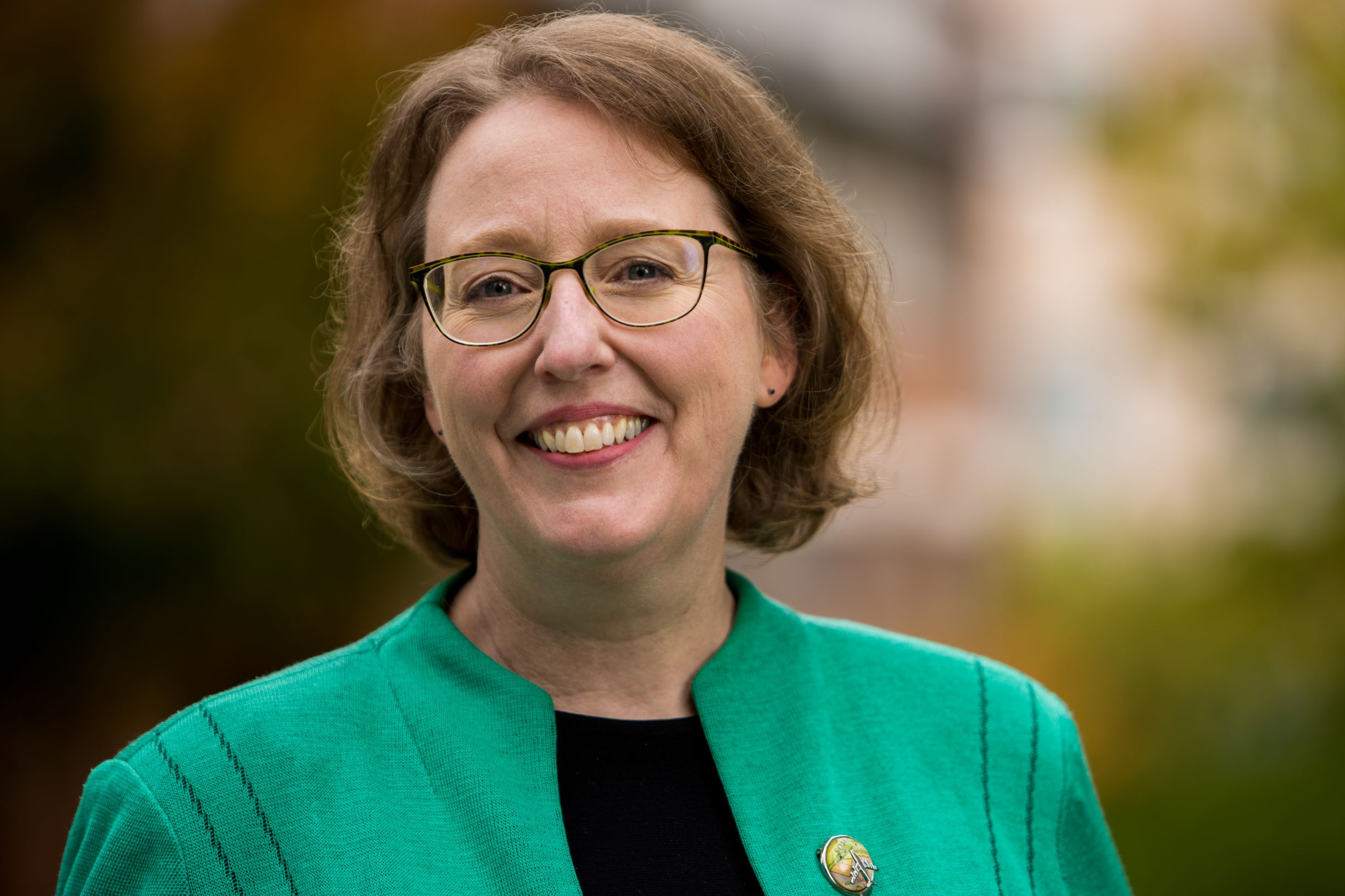
- Education: University of Pennsylvania; University of Oregon
- Academic career
- Fields: Decision Research; Numeracy affect heuristic Science Communication
- Institutions: Decision Sciences Research Institute; Ohio State University; University of Oregon

Ellen Peters is an American academic and the Philip H. Knight Chair, Director of the Center for Science Communication Research, and Professor both in the School of Journalism and Communication and in Psychology at the University of Oregon. She is also an associate in the Phil and Penny Knight Campus for Accelerating Scientific Impact. Prior to moving to the University of Oregon in 2019, she spent nine years in the psychology department at The Ohio State University where she was a Distinguished Professor. She also directed the Decision Sciences Collaborative in the College of Arts and Science and was a full member of the Cancer Control Center in Ohio State's Medical Center.

== Career ==
Peters received two B.A.s in Systems Engineering and Marketing from the University of Pennsylvania's Management and Technology Program. She earned her Ph.D. in Psychology from the University of Oregon with Paul Slovic as advisor. She began her professional career as a research scientist at Decision Research in Eugene, Oregon and was a senior research scientist when she moved to Ohio State University in 2010. There, from 2010 to 2012, she was an Associate Professor without tenure, becoming Full Professor with tenure in 2012 and Distinguished Professor of Psychology in 2017. In addition to her psychology professorship, she was a courtesy professor of General Internal Medicine (2015–2019), Rheumatology (2015–2019), and Marketing (2017–2019). In 2019, she joined the University of Oregon to be Philip H. Knight Chair and the first permanent director of their Center for Science Communication Research.

Peters' specialties are in judgment and decision making and risk and science communication. In particular, she conducts decision-making and communication research with respect to affect, numeracy, science communication, and adult aging. She collaborated on the development of the affect heuristic and is a leading scholar in the study of numeracy in decision making including publishing Innumeracy in the Wild: Misunderstanding and Misusing Numbers in 2020 with Oxford University Press. She is known both for her contributions to basic research on affect, numeracy, and risky decision-making, and for translational research on communicating health risks and improving medical decisions and policies. Recently, she has written about evidence-based recommendations for communicating the impacts of climate change on health, including for an invited perspective at the New England Journal of Medicine. She is also an active member of the Lancet Countdown U.S. Brief Working Group as it highlights key health threats posed by climate change and develops related policy recommendations.

Featured in The Philadelphia Inquirer and The Wall Street Journal, her work has engaged the public widely. She has published op-eds including on obsessing over coronavirus statistics in The New York Times and on helping the public figure out tricky pandemic statistics in The Atlanta Journal-Constitution.

Peters has worked extensively with federal agencies and other groups to advance decision and communication sciences. Since 2009, she has worked with the National Cancer Institute as a member of the group on Cognitive, Affective, and Social Processes in health Research (CASPhR) in the Behavioral Research Program. She also was a voting member and then chair of the U.S. Food and Drug Administration's Risk Communication Advisory Committee (2007–2009, 2011–2013). She was a member of the Committee on the Science of Science Communication: A Research Agenda, The National Academies of Sciences, Engineering, and Medicine from 2015 to 2017 and wrote a commissioned paper for the then-Institute of Medicine on the implications of numeracy for the Affordable Care Act.

Peters has served as president of the Society for Judgment and Decision Making and she is a fellow of the American Association for the Advancement of Science (AAAS), the American Psychological Association (APA), the Association for Psychological Science (APS), and the Society for Experimental Social Psychology (SESP).

== Honors ==
She received an NIH Group Merit Award for exceptional advances in integrating cognitive, affective, and social processes into cancer control research, and was the first American to win the Jane Beattie Scientific Recognition Award for innovative contributions to decision research.
