= Intraparietal sulcus =

Sulcus on the lateral surface of the parietal lobe

- Lateral surface of left cerebral hemisphere, viewed from the side. (Intraparietal sulcus visible at upper right, running horizontally.)

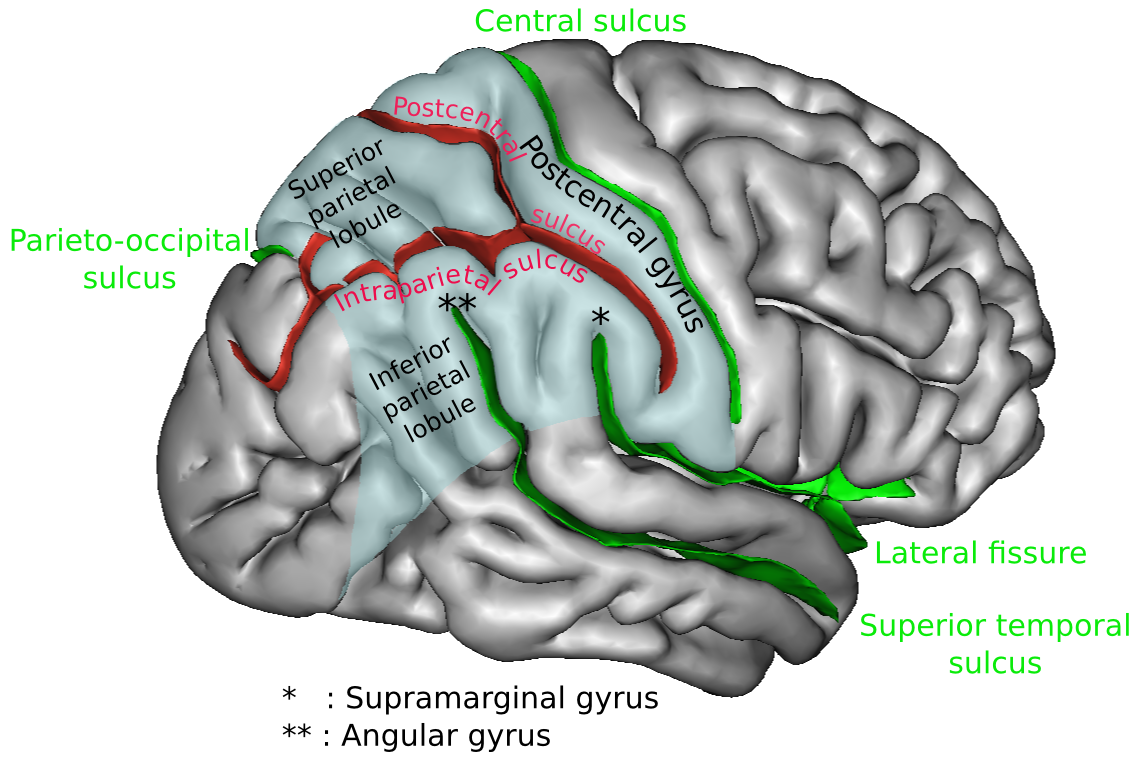
- Right cerebral hemisphere, viewed from the side. The region colored in blue is parietal lobe of the human brain. Intraparietal sulcus runs horizontally at the middle of the parietal lobe.

Details
- Part of: Parietal lobe

Identifiers
- Latin: sulcus intraparietalis
- Acronym: IPS
- NeuroNames: 97
- NeuroLex ID: birnlex_4031
- TA98: A14.1.09.127
- TA2: 5475
- FMA: 83772

The intraparietal sulcus (IPS) is located on the lateral surface of the parietal lobe, and consists of an oblique and a horizontal portion. The IPS contains a series of functionally distinct subregions that have been intensively investigated using both single cell neurophysiology in primates and human functional neuroimaging. Its principal functions are related to perceptual-motor coordination (e.g., directing eye movements and reaching) and visual attention, which allows for visually-guided pointing, grasping, and object manipulation that can produce a desired effect.

The intraparietal sulcus (IPS) plays a pivotal role in multisensory integration, particularly in linking visual and tactile information to guide complex motor actions. Beyond its established roles in numerical cognition and spatial attention, the IPS has emerged as a critical player in tool use and manipulation.

The IPS is also thought to play a role in other functions, including processing symbolic numerical information, visuospatial working memory, decision-making, and interpreting the intent of others.

== Function ==
Five regions of the intraparietal sulcus (IPS): anterior, lateral, ventral, caudal, and medial

- LIP & VIP: involved in visual attention and saccadic eye movements
- VIP & MIP: visual control of reaching and pointing
- AIP: visual control of grasping and manipulating hand movements
- CIP: perception of depth from stereopsis

All of these areas have projections to the frontal lobe for executive control.

Activity in the intraparietal sulcus has also been associated with the learning of sequences of finger movements.

The dorsal attention network includes the intraparietal sulcus of each hemisphere. The intraparietal sulcus is activated during voluntary orientation of attention.

=== Understanding numbers ===
Behavioral studies suggest that the IPS is associated with impairments of basic numerical magnitude processing and that there is a pattern of structural and functional alternations in the IPS and in the PFC in dyscalculia. Children with developmental dyscalculia were found to have less gray matter in the left IPS.

Studies have shown that electrical activity in a particular group of nerve cells in the intraparietal sulcus spiked when, and only when, volunteers were performing calculations. Outside experimental settings it was also found that when a patient mentioned a number—or even a quantitative reference, such as "some more", "many" or "bigger than the other one"—there was a spike of electrical activity in the same nerve-cell population of the intraparietal sulcus that was activated when the patient was doing calculations under experimental conditions.

Numerical magnitude processing refers to the cognitive ability to understand and compare numbers. This assists in tasks that involve estimation, mathematical processes, and decision-making. The intraparietal sulci are made up of two parts, left and right. The right intraparietal sulcus is involved more in non-symbolic numerical tasks, which involve estimation and spatial reasoning. The left intraparietal sulcus focuses on symbolic numerical tasks, which involves understanding symbols and mathematical operations. Studies have demonstrated that the right intraparietal sulcus shows more activity during magnitude estimation and length comparison tasks. Researchers discovered that disrupted activity in the right intraparietal lobe using rTMS, (repetitive transcranial magnetic stimulation) resulted in participants having difficulties with performance in both the magnitude and length tasks. Studies have shown that children who show a larger change in brain activity in the left intraparietal sulcus tend to perform better at arithmetic tasks. This suggests that the left intraparietal sulcus plays an important role when it comes to numerical processing and mathematics.

== Damage ==
Damage to the intraparietal sulcus (IPS) can make it difficult to represent and manipulate numerical quantities. Research completed by Ganor-Stern et al. investigated the involvement of the IPS in estimating the results of multi-digit multiplication problems. In a computation estimation task, they compared a 24-year-old female (JD) with damage in the left IPS to an age-matched control group. During this estimation task, participants were presented with multi-digit multiplication problems accompanied by reference numbers. They were asked to estimate whether the exact answer to each problem was larger or smaller than the reference number. JD did not show the typical patterns of distance and size effects compared to control groups during this task. JD also had an atypical strategy in which she only used the approximated calculation strategy that involved rounding and calculating procedures. Most control participants used both a calculation strategy and the sense of magnitude strategy, which relies on an intuitive approximated magnitude representation of the results. The findings of this study suggest that damage to the IPS impaired JD's representations of magnitude, which play an important role in everyday estimation tasks.

== Additional images ==
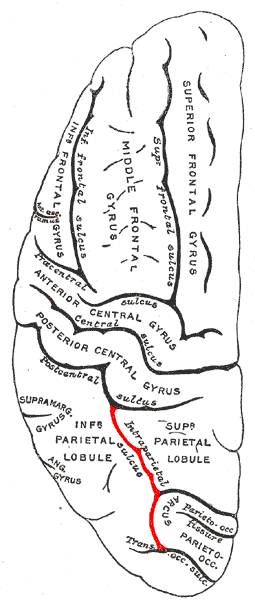
Lateral surface of left cerebral hemisphere, viewed from above.

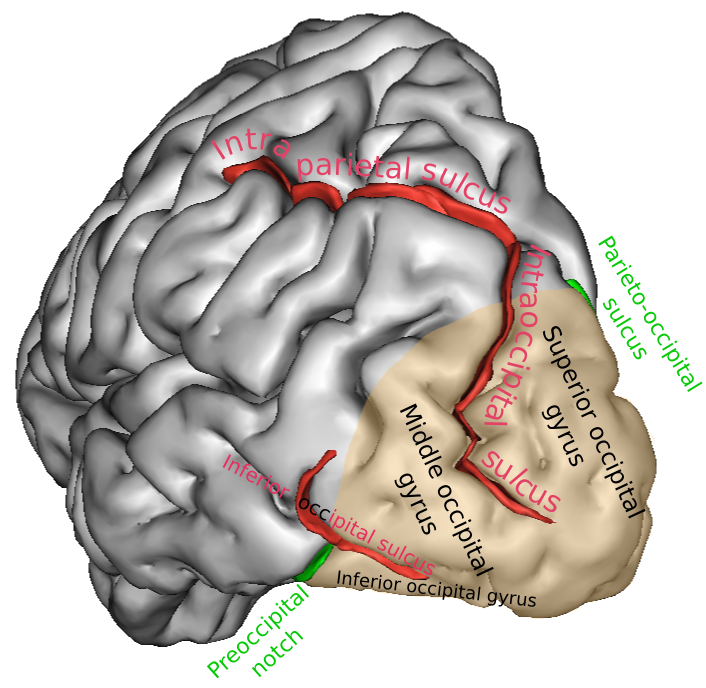
Left cerebral hemisphere, viewed from the back. (Intraparietal sulcus visible at top center)

Human brain dissection video (53 sec). Demonstrating position of the intraparietal sulcus of the left cerebral hemisphere.
