= Innumeracy (book) =

1988 book by John Allen Paulos

Innumeracy: Mathematical Illiteracy and its Consequences
- Hardcover
- Author: John Allen Paulos
- Subject: Mathematics and society
- Publisher: Hill and Wang
- Publication date: 1988
- Pages: 135
- ISBN: 0-8090-7447-8
- Website: web.archive.org/web/20211130063438/http://johnallenpaulos.com/innumeracy.html

Innumeracy: Mathematical Illiteracy and its Consequences is a 1988 book by mathematician John Allen Paulos about innumeracy (deficiency of numeracy) as the mathematical equivalent of illiteracy: incompetence with numbers rather than words. Innumeracy is a problem with many otherwise educated and knowledgeable people. While many people would be ashamed to admit they are illiterate, there is very little shame in admitting innumeracy by saying things like "I'm a people person, not a numbers person", or "I always hated math", but Paulos challenges whether that widespread cultural excusing of innumeracy is truly worthy of acceptability.

Paulos speaks mainly of the common misconceptions about, and inability to deal comfortably with, numbers, and the logic and meaning that they represent. He looks at real-world examples in stock scams, psychics, astrology, sports records, elections, sex discrimination, UFOs, insurance and law, lotteries, and drug testing. Paulos discusses innumeracy with quirky anecdotes, scenarios, and facts, encouraging readers in the end to look at their world in a more quantitative way. The book sheds light on the link between innumeracy and pseudoscience. For example, the fortune telling psychic's few correct and general observations are remembered over the many incorrect guesses. He also stresses the problem between the actual number of occurrences of various risks and popular perceptions of those risks happening. The problems of innumeracy come at a great cost to society. Topics include probability and coincidence, innumeracy in pseudoscience, statistics, and trade-offs in society. For example, the danger of getting killed in a car accident is much greater than terrorism and this danger should be reflected in how we allocate our limited resources.

== Background ==
John Allen Paulos (born July 4, 1945) is an American professor of mathematics at Temple University in Pennsylvania. He is a writer and speaker on mathematics and the importance of mathematical literacy. Paulos writes about many subjects, especially of the dangers of mathematical innumeracy; that is, the layperson's misconceptions about numbers, probability, and logic. He has received awards including the 2013 JPBM (Joint Policy Board for Mathematics) Award for Communicating Mathematics on a Sustained Basis to Large Audiences and the 2003 AAAS (American Association for the Advancement of Science) Award for Promoting the Public Understanding of Science and Technology.

As a reason for writing the book he states:

Innumeracy, an inability to deal comfortably with the fundamental notions of number and chance, plagues far too many otherwise knowledgeable citizens. The same people who cringe when words such as "imply" and "infer" are confused react without a trace of embarrassment to even the most egregious of numerical solecisms. I remember once listening to someone at a party drone on about the difference between "continually" and "continuously." Later that evening we were watching the news, and the TV weathercaster announced that there was a 50 percent chance of rain for Saturday and a 50 percent chance for Sunday, and concluded that there was therefore a 100 percent chance of rain that weekend. The remark went right by the self-styled grammarian, and even after I explained the mistake to him, he wasn't nearly as indignant as he would have been had the weathercaster left a dangling participle.

== Chapters ==
1. Examples and Principles. This chapter goes over how people's lack of clarity of very large numbers lead to misconceptions. He argues for scientific notation being a clearer way to work with larger numbers. The ability to put numbers large and small in the correct context is key to understanding them in an intelligent way. He gives examples in some jokes, Rubik's Cube, nuclear weapons, travel at the speed of light, the number of three-scoop combinations at Baskin-Robbins, dice rolls, the chance of getting AIDS, and the chance of breathing the same molecule of breath as Julius Caesar.
2. Probability and Coincidence. Underestimates of the frequency of coincidences is an example of innumeracy. People underestimate that an unlikely event is likely, given a large population sample. He gives examples in stock market newsletter scams, choosing a spouse, coincidence and the law, coin toss, and the hot-hand fallacy in sports.
3. Pseudoscience. Here the author takes on how non-falsifiable statements play in with pseudoscience. For example Whatever God wills happens can not be proven false so is not part of science. He touches examples in Freud, Marx, parapsychology, dream prediction, astrology, UFOs, fraudulent medical treatments, conditional probability, blackjack, drug testing, and numerology.
4. What is Innumeracy? Here the author critiques public math education; the need for estimation in the math curriculum; math and humor (Paulos suggests that mathematicians have a particular sense of humor); innumeracy and the tendency to personalize excessively versus a statistical analysis; selective filtering of data to draw incorrect conclusions; decisions and framing of questions; various misconceptions about math being cold, impersonal or constraining; and public safety risks.
5. Statistics, Trade-Offs, and Society. This chapter addresses trade-offs in public policy, the prisoner's dilemma, and type I and type II errors in statistics (when a true hypothesis is thought to be untrue, or when a false hypothesis is thought to be true). Polling confidence interval is addressed, along with the law of large numbers, correlation does not imply causation, and other statistical mistakes.

== Analysis ==
Innumeracy made the New York Times best seller when it came out in 1988; it was on the best seller for 18 weeks. There was a slightly revised edition in 2001. It received favorable reviews in the New York Times "He takes us a couple of steps closer to numeracy, and it is all in all an enlightening place to be." The Chicago Tribune wrote "Despite the title, which suggests yet another learned report documenting the sorry state of America's educational system, what Paulos provides is a readable romp across a varied mathematical landscape. It serves as an excellent antidote to tedious classroom lectures on the difference between inverse and direct proportions." The Los Angeles Times review noted "Paulos is very good at explaining all of this, though sometimes with a hectoring, bitter tone, for which he apologizes at the very end." The Christian Science Monitor review said "Should you read Innumeracy if you enjoy reading math problems and reasoning them out? Yes, it's fun. Should you read it if you think you hate math and are turned off by math problems? Yes, you may even get turned on."
