= National Numeracy Network =

Professional organization that promotes numeracy in the United States

The National Numeracy Network (NNN) is a multidisciplinary US-based organization that promotes numeracy, i.e., the ability to reason and to apply simple numerical concepts. The organization sponsors an annual conference and its website provides a repository of resources for teaching numeracy.

== Numeracy ==
NNN is also host to the journal Numeracy, an open-access, and peer-reviewed publication supported by the University of South Florida Libraries.
