= Parallel individuation system =

Cognitive system for number sense

The parallel individuation system, also called object tracking system is a non-symbolic cognitive system that supports the representation of numerical values from zero to three (in infants) or four (in adults and non-human animals). It is one of the two cognitive systems responsible for the representation of number, the other one being the approximate number system. Unlike the approximate number system, which is not precise and provides only an estimation of the number, the parallel individuation system is an exact system and encodes the exact numerical identity of the individual items. While counting and estimation correspond to the approximate number system, the parallel individuation system is tied to subitizing. The parallel individuation system has been attested in human adults, non-human animals, such as fish and human infants, although performance of infants is dependent on their age and task.

== Evidence ==
The evidence for parallel individuation system comes from a number of experiments on adults, infants and non-human animals. For example, adults perform error-free when they enumerate elements for numerosities from one to four, after which their error rate rises. Similarly, infants of 10 to 12 months represented the values for "exactly one", "exactly two" and "exactly three", but not for higher numbers, in a task based on hidden object retrieval.

Parallel individuation system in animals was demonstrated in an experiment in which guppies were tested on their preference of social groups of different size, under the assumption that they have a preference for bigger-size groups. In this experiment, fish successfully discriminated between numbers from 1 to 4 but after this number their performance decreased. However, not all studies find confirmation of this system and for example New Zealand robins showed no difference in their understanding of small (1 to 4) and larger (above 4) amounts.
