= Dehaene =

Dehaene is a surname. Notable people with the surname include:

- Stanislas Dehaene, a professor at the Collège de France
- Jean-Luc Dehaene, former Prime Minister of Belgium
- Luc Dehaene, former mayor of Ypres
- Tom Dehaene, Flemish politician, son of Jean-Luc Dehaene.
