= Ordinal numerical competence =

In human developmental psychology or non-human primate experiments, ordinal numerical competence or ordinal numerical knowledge is the ability to count objects in order and to understand the greater than and less than relationships between numbers. It has been shown that children as young as two can make some ordinal numerical decisions. There are studies indicating that some non-human primates, like chimpanzees and rhesus monkeys have some ordinal numerical competence.

== In humans ==
=== Prenatal ===
There is no evidence to support prenatal ordinal numerical competence. Teratogens such as stress can alter prenatal neural development, leading to diminished competence after birth. Physical effects of teratogens are common, but endocrine effects are harder to measure. These are the factors that influence neural development and by extension the development of ordinal numerical competence. Premature birth is also a risk factor for developmental problems including reduced brain activity. Brain activity is measured from outside the body with electroencephalography.

=== Infants ===
There have been a vast number of studies done on infants and their knowledge of numbers. Most research confirms that infants do in fact have a profound innate sense of number, both in abstract and finite ways. Infants as young as 49 hours can accurately match up images with a certain number of objects, with sounds that contain the same number ("ra, ra, ra, ra") as the number of objects in the image. Because the sounds are abstract, or visibly there, we can see that infants as young as 49 hours have some abstract numerical sense as well as concrete numerical sense shown by their recognition of the image with the corresponding number of objects. Similarly, infants around the age of 7 months can also match up images of random objects.

Although children as young as 49 hours can match up the number of sounds with the number of objects, they can only do so at certain ratios. When 1:3 ratios were used (4 sounds and 4 objects or 12 objects), around 90% of the infants paid more attention to the corresponding image thus showing their recognition. However, when 1:2 ratios were used, only 68% of infants showed recognition of the correct corresponding image. This tells us that although infants can recognize corresponding numbers of sounds and objects, the two images of objects must be visibly different - one must have a much larger number of objects, or a much smaller number of objects.

Although there has to be a stark difference in the choices for infants to recognize the correct matching set of numbers (1:3 vs 1:2), this seems to prove that infants have an innate numerical sense, but it may not be the same numerical sense as older children. Around the age of three and a half years children lose some of their numerical sense. Whereas children younger than three can recognize that four pebbles spread out in a line is less than six pebbles scrunched together in a line, children around the age of three and a half mysteriously lose this ability. Researchers believe that this is because children around this age begin to rely heavily on the physical properties of the world and objects within it, such that longer equals more. Although the ability to recognize that six pebbles closely lined up together is more than four pebbles spread out farther from one another goes away around that age, it comes back around four years of age when children begin to count.

=== Adults ===
Both behavioral research and brain-imaging research show distinct differences in the way "exact" arithmetic and "approximate" arithmetic are processed. Exact arithmetic is information that is precise and follows specific rules and patterns such as multiplication tables or geometric formulas, and approximate arithmetic is a general comparison between numbers such as the comparisons of greater than or less than. Research shows that exact arithmetic is language-based and processed in the left inferior frontal lobe. Approximate arithmetic is processed much differently in a different part of the brain. Approximate arithmetic is processed in the bilateral areas of the parietal lobes. This part of the brain processes visual information to understand how objects are spatially related to each other, for example, understanding that 10 of something is more than two of something. This difference in brain function can create a difference in how we experience certain types of arithmetic. Approximate arithmetic can be experienced as intuitive and exact arithmetic experienced as recalled knowledge.

The conclusions from behavioral research and brain-imaging research are supported by observations of patients with injuries to certain parts of the brain. People with left parietal injuries can lose the ability to understand quantities of things, but keep at least some ability to do exact arithmetic, such as multiplication. People with left-hemisphere brain damage can lose the ability to do exact arithmetic, but keep a sense of quantity, including the ability to compare larger and smaller numbers. This information confirms that distinct parts of the brain are used to know and use approximate and exact arithmetic.

Various researchers suggest that the processing of approximate arithmetic could be related to the numerical abilities that have been independently established in various animal species and in preverbal human infants. This may mean that approximate arithmetic is an adaptive train that humans developed through evolution. The combination of this potential evolutionary trait and language-based exact arithmetic may be the reason that humans are able to do advanced mathematics like physics.

== In non-humans ==
Animals share a non-verbal system for representing number as analogue magnitudes. Animals have been known to base their rationality on Weber’s Law. This historically important psychological law quantifies the perception of change in a given stimulus. The law states that the change in a stimulus that will be just noticeable is a constant ratio of the original stimulus. Weber’s Law describes discriminability between values based on perceptual continua such as line length, brightness, and weight.

=== Rhesus monkeys ===
Studies of rhesus monkeys' foraging decisions indicate that animals spontaneously, and without training, exhibit rudimentary numerical abilities. Most animals can determine numbers in the values 1 through 9, but recent experiments have discovered that rhesus monkeys can quantify values from 1 to 30. Monkeys' numerical discrimination capacity is imposed by the ratio of the values compared, rather than absolute set size. This computation process focuses around Weber’s Law and the expectation violation procedure. This suggests that rhesus monkeys have access to a spontaneous system of representation, which encodes the numerical differences between sets of one, two and three objects, and contrasts three objects from either four or five objects as well. These representations indicate the semantics of an encoded natural language. These encoded natural languages are also seen in experiments with many animals including pigeons and rats.

=== Rats and pigeons ===
Experiments have shown that rats are able to be trained to press one lever after hearing two bursts of white noise, then press another lever after four bursts of white noise. The interburst interval is varied between trials so the discrimination is based on number of bursts and not time duration of the sequence. Studies show that rats as well as pigeons learned to make different responses to both short and long durations of signals. During testing, rats exhibited a pattern called break-run-break; when it came to responding after a stint of little to no response, they would suddenly respond in high frequency, then return to little or no response activity. Data suggests that rats and pigeons are able to process time and number information at the same time. The Mode Control Model shows that these animals can process number and time information by transmission pulses to accumulators controlled by switches that operate different modes.

== See also ==
- Plant arithmetic
