= Plant arithmetic =

Form of plant intelligence

Plant arithmetic is a form of plant intelligence whereby plants appear to perform arithmetic operations – a form of number sense in plants. Some such plants include the Venus flytrap and Arabidopsis thaliana.

== Arithmetic by species ==
=== Venus flytrap ===
A closing trap

The Venus flytrap can count to two and five in order to trap and then digest its prey.

The Venus flytrap is a carnivorous plant that catches its prey with a trapping structure formed by the terminal portion of each of the plant's leaves, which is triggered by tiny hairs on their inner surfaces. A Venus flytrap's reactions can occur due to electric and mechanical, or movement-related, changes. When an insect or spider crawling along the leaves contacts a hair, the trap prepares to close, snapping shut only if a second contact occurs within approximately twenty seconds of the first strike. The requirement of redundant triggering in this mechanism serves as a safeguard against wasting energy by trapping objects with no nutritional value, and the plant will only begin digestion after five more stimuli to ensure it has caught a live bug worthy of consumption.

There are two steps, which are a closed and locked state, that a Venus flytrap undergoes after its open state and before digestion, which differ due to the formation of the trap. A closed trap occurs when the two lobes close or catch prey. A locked trap occurs when the cilia further trap the prey. The trap can possess a strength of four newtons. In addition, the cilia can further hinder a creature's ability to escape.

The mechanism is so highly specialized that it can distinguish between living prey and non-prey stimuli, such as falling raindrops; two trigger hairs must be touched in succession within 20 seconds of each other or one hair touched twice in rapid succession, whereupon the lobes of the trap will snap shut, typically in about one-tenth of a second.

The number of days that the trap remains closed will depend on whether or not the plant has caught prey. Furthermore, the size of the prey can affect the number of days needed for digestion. If a creature is too small, then the Venus flytrap has the ability to release it, which means that it can start the stage of becoming semi-open. The transition from closed to open will take two days and can result after the plant has finished digesting or determining it has not caught anything worthwhile. One day will be needed to become semi-open, which creates a concave look, and the other day will allow the Venus flytrap to become fully open, which creates a convex look. The angle of a Venus flytrap's lobes when they are open can be impacted by the water within it.

=== Arabidopsis thaliana ===
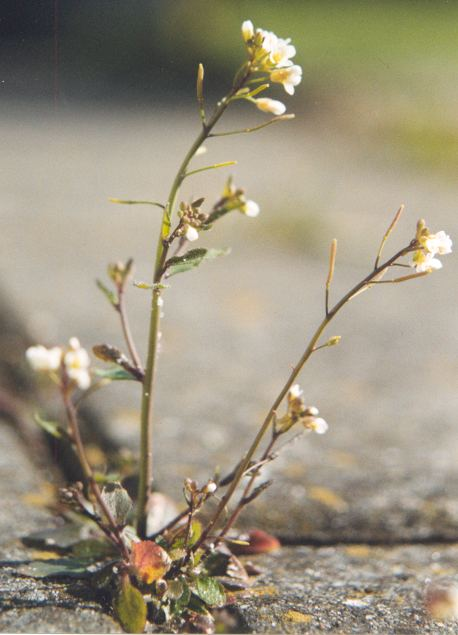
Arabidopsis thaliana

Arabidopsis thaliana in effect performs division to control starch use at night.

Most plants accumulate starch by day, then metabolize it at a fixed rate during night time. However, if the onset of darkness is unusually early, Arabidopsis thaliana reduces its use of starch by an amount that effectively requires division. However, there are alternative explanations, such as feedback control by sensing the amount of soluble sugars left. As of 2015, open questions remain.

== See also ==
- Plant communication – Biological communication by plants
- Plant perception (physiology) – Plants interaction to environment
