= Spatial-numerical association of response codes =

The spatial-numerical association of response codes (SNARC) is an example of the spatial organisation of magnitude information. Put simply, when presented with smaller numbers (0 to 4), people tend to respond faster if those stimuli are associated with the left extrapersonal hemiside of their perceived surroundings; when presented with larger numbers (6 to 9), people respond faster if those stimuli are instead associated with the right extrapersonal hemiside of their perceived surroundings. The SNARC effect is this automatic association that occurs between the location of the response hand and the semantic magnitude of a modality-independent number.

Even for tasks in which magnitude is irrelevant, like parity judgement or phoneme detection, larger numbers are faster responded to with the right response key while smaller numbers are faster responded to with the left. This also occurs when the hands are crossed, with the right hand activating the left response key and vice versa. The explanation given by Dehaene and colleagues is that the magnitude of a number on an oriented mental number line is automatically activated. The mental number line is assumed to be oriented from left to right in populations with a left-to-right writing system (e.g. English), and oriented from right to left in populations with a right-to-left writing system (e.g. Iranian)

== Effects ==
The SNARC has been observed primarily in two scenarios: attentional and oculomotor. The first of these involves people being faster to detect left probes after smaller numbers are shown and right probes after large numbers, whereas the oculomotor effects are seen when participants look at greater speeds towards the left after detecting small numbers and to the right after detecting large ones.

Newer research shows a motor bias to also be associated with the SNARC effect. In an experiment conducted into random number generation, participants tended to generate numbers of a larger magnitude when turning their heads to the right, and numbers of a smaller magnitude when turning their heads to the left. This has been replicated using hand sizes: smaller distances between the index finger and thumb when generating a random number evoked smaller numbers, and larger spaces evoked larger numbers.
