= Subitizing =

Perception of object number without counting

An observer may be able to instantly judge how many red circles are present without counting them, but would find it harder to do so for the greater number of blue circles.

Subitizing is the rapid, accurate, and effortless ability to perceive small quantities of items in a set, typically when there are four or fewer items, without relying on linguistic or arithmetic processes. The term refers to the sensation of instantly knowing how many objects are in the visual scene when their number falls within the subitizing range.

Sets larger than about four to five items cannot be subitized unless the items appear in a pattern with which the person is familiar (such as the six dots on one face of a die). Large, familiar sets might be counted one-by-one (or the person might calculate the number through a rapid calculation if they can mentally group the elements into a few small sets). A person could also estimate the number of a large set—a skill similar to, but different from, subitizing. The term subitizing was coined in 1949 by E. L. Kaufman et al., and is derived from the Latin adjective subitus (meaning "sudden").

The accuracy, speed, and confidence with which observers make judgments of the number of items are critically dependent on the number of elements to be enumerated.

While the increase in response time for each additional element within a display is 250–350 ms per item outside the subitizing range, there is still a significant, albeit smaller, increase of 40–100 ms per item within the subitizing range. A similar pattern of reaction times is found in young children, although with steeper slopes for both the subitizing range and the enumeration range.

A 2006 study demonstrated that subitizing and counting are not restricted to visual perception, but also extend to tactile perception, when observers had to name the number of stimulated fingertips. Even though the existence of subitizing in tactile perception has been questioned, this effect has been replicated many times and can be therefore considered as robust. The subitizing effect has also been obtained in tactile perception with congenitally blind adults.

== Enumerating afterimages ==
As the derivation of the term subitizing suggests, the feeling associated with making a number judgment within the subitizing range is one of immediately being aware of the displayed elements. When the number of objects presented exceeds the subitizing range, this feeling is lost, and observers commonly report an impression of shifting their viewpoint around the display, until all the elements presented have been counted. The ability of observers to count the number of items within a display can be limited, either by the rapid presentation and subsequent masking of items, or by requiring observers to respond quickly. Both procedures have little, if any, effect on enumeration within the subitizing range. These techniques may restrict the ability of observers to count items by limiting the degree to which observers can shift their "zone of attention" successively to different elements within the display.

Atkinson, Campbell, and Francis demonstrated that visual afterimages could be employed in order to achieve similar results. Using a flashgun to illuminate a line of white disks, they were able to generate intense afterimages in dark-adapted observers. Observers were required to verbally report how many disks had been presented, both at 10 s and at 60 s after the flashgun exposure. Observers reported being able to see all the disks presented for at least 10 s, and being able to perceive at least some of the disks after 60 s. Unlike simply displaying the images for 10- and 60-second intervals, when presented in the form of afterimages, eye movement cannot be employed for the purpose of counting: when the subjects move their eyes, the images also move. Despite a long period of time to enumerate the number of disks presented when the number of disks presented fell outside the subitizing range (i.e., 5–12 disks), observers made consistent enumeration errors in both the 10 s and 60 s conditions. In contrast, no errors occurred within the subitizing range (i.e., 1–4 disks), in either the 10 s or 60 s conditions.

== Brain structures involved in subitizing and counting ==
The work on the enumeration of afterimages supports the view that different cognitive processes operate for the enumeration of elements inside and outside the subitizing range, and as such raises the possibility that subitizing and counting involve different brain circuits. However, functional imaging research has been interpreted both to support different and shared processes.

=== Bálint's syndrome ===
Social theory supporting the view that subitizing and counting may involve functionally and anatomically distinct brain areas comes from patients with simultanagnosia, one of the key components of Bálint's syndrome. Patients with this disorder suffer from an inability to perceive visual scenes properly, being unable to localize objects in space by looking at the objects, pointing to them, or verbally reporting their position. Despite these dramatic symptoms, such patients are able to correctly recognize individual objects. Crucially, people with simultanagnosia are unable to enumerate objects outside the subitizing range, either failing to count certain objects, or alternatively counting the same object several times.

However, people with simultanagnosia have no difficulty enumerating objects within the subitizing range. The disorder is associated with bilateral damage to the parietal lobe, an area of the brain linked with spatial shifts of attention. These neuropsychological results are consistent with the view that the process of counting, but not that of subitizing, requires active shifts of attention. However, recent research has questioned this conclusion by finding that attention also affects subitizing.

=== Imaging enumeration ===
A further source of research on the neural processes of subitizing compared to counting comes from positron emission tomography (PET) research on normal observers. Such research compares the brain activity associated with enumeration processes inside (i.e., 1–4 items) for subitizing, and outside (i.e., 5–8 items) for counting.

Such research finds that within the subitizing and counting range activation occurs bilaterally in the occipital extrastriate cortex and superior parietal lobe/intraparietal sulcus. This has been interpreted as evidence that shared processes are involved. However, the existence of further activations during counting in the right inferior frontal regions, and the anterior cingulate have been interpreted as suggesting the existence of distinct processes during counting related to the activation of regions involved in the shifting of attention.

== Educational applications ==
Historically, many systems have attempted to use subitizing to identify full or partial quantities. In the twentieth century, mathematics educators started to adopt some of these systems, as reviewed in the examples below, but often switched to more abstract color-coding to represent quantities up to ten.

In the 1990s, babies three weeks old were shown to differentiate between 1–3 objects, that is, to subitize. A more recent meta-study summarizing five different studies concluded that infants are born with an innate ability to differentiate quantities within a small range, which increases over time. By the age of seven that ability increases to 4–7 objects.

=== Abacus ===
The hypothesized use of yupana, an Inca counting system, placed up to five counters in connected trays for calculations.

In each place value, the Chinese abacus uses four or five beads to represent units, which are subitized, and one or two separate beads, which symbolize fives. This allows multi-digit operations such as carrying and borrowing to occur without subitizing beyond five.

European abacuses use ten beads in each register, but usually separate them into fives by color.

=== Twentieth century teaching tools ===
The idea of instant recognition of quantities has been adopted by several pedagogical systems, such as Montessori, Cuisenaire and Dienes. However, these systems only partially use subitizing, attempting to make all quantities from 1 to 10 instantly recognizable. To achieve it, they code quantities by color and length of rods or bead strings representing them. Recognizing such visual or tactile representations and associating quantities with them involves different mental operations from subitizing.

== Other applications ==
One of the most basic applications is in digit grouping in large numbers, which allow one to tell the size at a glance, rather than having to count. For example, writing one million (1000000) as 1,000,000 (or 1.000.000 or 1000000) or one (short) billion (1000000000) as 1,000,000,000 (or other forms, such as 1,00,00,00,000 in the Indian numbering system) makes it much easier to read. This is particularly important in accounting and finance, as an error of a single decimal digit changes the amount by a factor of ten. This is also found in computer programming languages for literal values, some of which use digit separators.

Dice, playing cards and other gaming devices traditionally split quantities into subitizable groups with recognizable patterns. The behavioural advantage of this grouping method has been scientifically investigated by Ciccione and Dehaene, who showed that counting performances are improved if the groups share the same amount of items and the same repeated pattern.

A comparable application is to split up binary and hexadecimal number representations, telephone numbers, bank account numbers (e.g., IBAN, social security numbers, number plates, etc.) into groups ranging from 2 to 5 digits separated by spaces, dots, dashes, or other separators. This is done to support overseeing completeness of a number when comparing or retyping. This practice of grouping characters also supports easier memorization of large numbers and character structures.

== Self assessment ==
There is at least one game that can be played online to self assess one's ability to subitize.

== See also ==
- Approximate number system
- Numerical cognition
- Visual indexing theory#Subitizing studies
