= Counting =

Finding the number of elements of a finite set

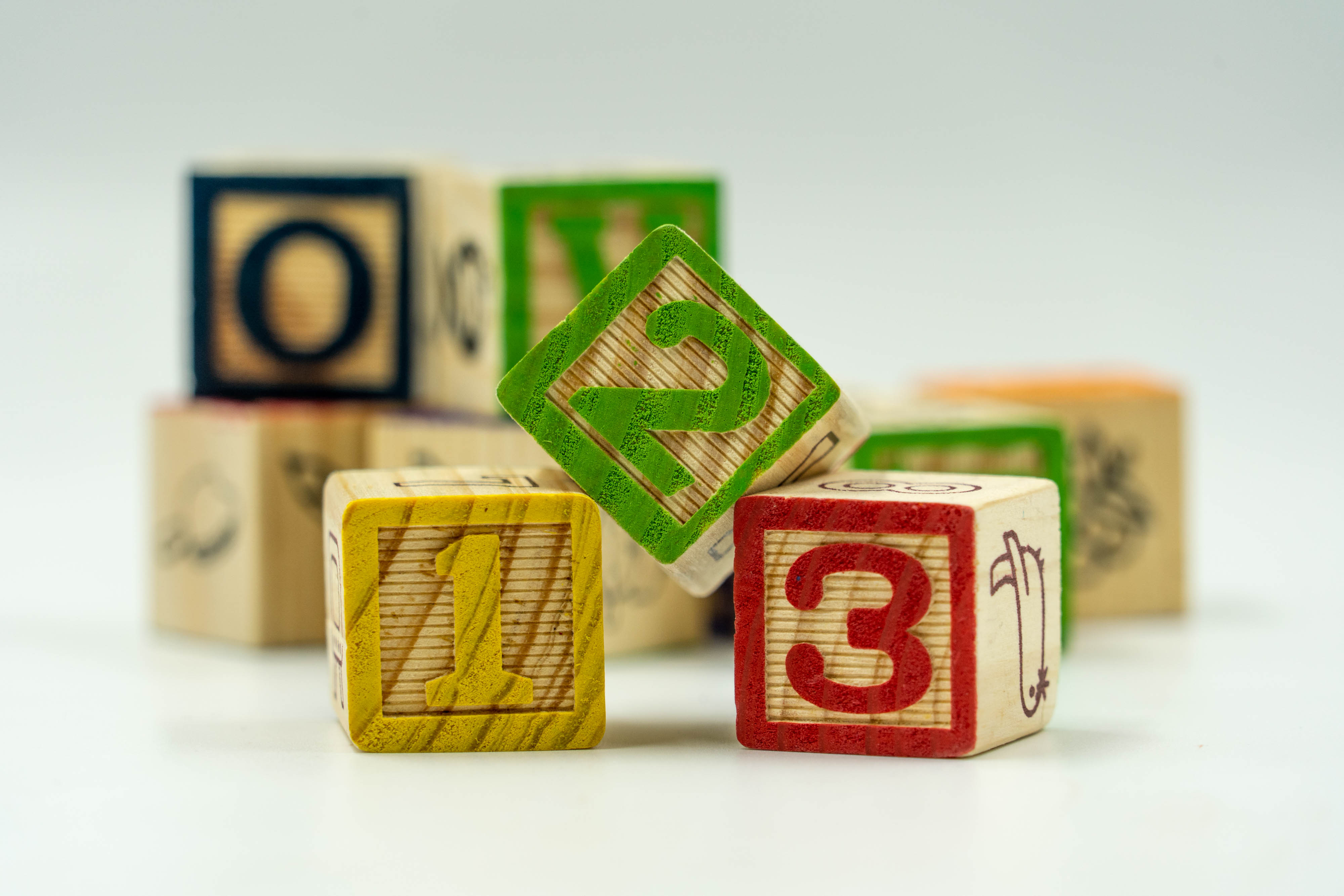
Number blocks, which can be used for counting

Counting refers to two interrelated processes: "Counting [something]" refers to determining how many elements there are in a finite set. "Counting up" and "counting down" refer to starting at some number and repeatedly incrementing or decrementing (respectively) by a fixed difference (1 unless otherwise specified as "counting by [N]s"). The latter is a process that can be used to perform the former: one can start the counter at 0, then add 1 for each element in the set, keeping track of which items have already been counted to avoid double-counting; the final counter value once all elements have been enumerated and counted is the size of the set.

Counting sometimes involves numbers other than one; for example, when counting money, counting out change, "counting by twos" (2, 4, 6, 8, 10, 12, ...), or "counting by fives" (5, 10, 15, 20, 25, ...).

There is archaeological evidence suggesting that humans have been counting for at least 50,000 years. Counting was primarily used by ancient cultures to keep track of social and economic data such as the number of group members, prey animals, property, or debts (that is, accountancy). Notched bones were also found in the Border Caves in South Africa, which may suggest that the concept of counting was known to humans as far back as 44,000 BCE. The development of counting led to the development of mathematical notation, numeral systems, and writing.

== Forms of counting ==
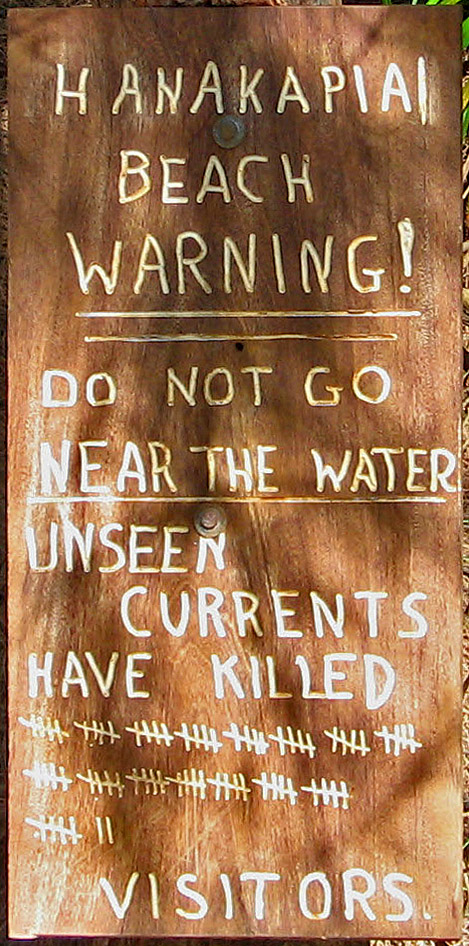
Counting using tally marks at Hanakapiai Beach

Verbal counting involves speaking sequential numbers aloud or mentally to track progress. Generally such counting is done with base 10 numbers: "1, 2, 3, 4", etc. Verbal counting is often used for objects that are currently present rather than for counting things over time, since following an interruption counting must resume from where it was left off, a number that has to be recorded or remembered.

Counting a small set of objects, especially over time, can be accomplished efficiently with tally marks: making a mark for each number and then counting all of the marks when done tallying. Tallying is base 1 counting.

Finger counting is convenient and common for small numbers. Children count on fingers to facilitate tallying and for performing simple mathematical operations. Older finger counting methods used the four fingers and the three bones in each finger (phalanges) to count to twelve. Other hand-gesture systems are also in use, for example the Chinese system by which one can count to 10 using only gestures of one hand. With finger binary it is possible to keep a finger count up to 1023 = 2^{10} − 1.

Various devices can also be used to facilitate counting, such as tally counters and abacuses.

== Inclusive counting ==
Inclusive/exclusive counting are two different methods of counting. For inclusive counting, units are counted beginning with the start of the starting point and ending with the end of the last point. For exclusive counting, units are counted at the end of each interval, therefore the starting point is excluded. This results in a count which is always greater by one when using inclusive counting, as compared to using exclusive counting, for the same set. Apparently, the introduction of the number zero to the number line resolved this difficulty; however, inclusive counting is still useful for some things.

Refer also to the fencepost error, which is a type of off-by-one error.

Inclusive counting is usually encountered when dealing with time in Roman calendars and the Romance languages. In the ancient Roman calendar, the nones (meaning "nine") is 8 days before the ides; more generally, dates are specified as inclusively counted days up to the next named day.

In the Christian liturgical calendar, Quinquagesima (meaning 50) is 49 days before Easter Sunday. When counting "inclusively", the Sunday (the start day) will be day 1 and therefore the following Sunday will be the eighth day. For example, the French phrase for "fortnight" is quinzaine (15 [days]), and similar words are present in Greek (δεκαπενθήμερο, dekapenthímero), Spanish (quincena) and Portuguese (quinzena).

In contrast, the English word "fortnight" itself derives from "a fourteen-night", as the archaic "sennight" does from "a seven-night"; the English words are not examples of inclusive counting. In exclusive-counting languages such as English, when counting eight days "from Sunday", Monday will be day 1, Tuesday day 2, and the following Monday will be the eighth day. For many years it was a standard practice in English law for the phrase "from a date" to mean "beginning on the day after that date": this practice is now deprecated because of the high risk of misunderstanding.

Similar counting is involved in East Asian age reckoning, in which newborns are considered to be 1 at birth.

Musical terminology also uses inclusive counting of intervals between notes of the standard scale: going up one note is a second interval, going up two notes is a third interval, etc., and going up seven notes is an octave.

== Education and development ==
Learning to count is an important educational and developmental milestone in most cultures of the world. Learning to count is a child's very first step into mathematics, and constitutes the most fundamental idea of that discipline. However, some cultures in Amazonia and the Australian Outback do not count, and their languages do not have number words.

=== Reciting the counting list ===
From the age of two, children gradually learn the ordered sequence of number words. They initially learn a short part of the sequence and progressively extend it to larger numbers. At first, children may say “one, two, three, …” without necessarily understanding what individual number words mean. Through development, children learn the meaning of each number word.

=== Object counting ===
Learning to count involves more than memorising the counting list. It is important that children learn that, when counting, each object can be paired with only one number word. This is described as one-to-one correspondence. Some counting tasks require children to count a set of items instead of reciting the count sequence so they can learn how the counting sequence is used to represent the numerosity of a set.

Classic accounts of counting development identify several principles that allow the verbal count to provide information about how many items a set has. The stable-order principle states that number words must be recited in the established order. A child who produces number words in the wrong order (e.g., “one, two, four…”) cannot correctly identify the numerosity of the set. The one-to-one correspondence principle requires each object in a set to be associated with one, and only one, number word. When counting, a child must assign a different number word to each successive object without skipping or counting the same object twice. The cardinality principle states that the last recited number word represents the total number of objects in the set. The abstraction principle states that counting can be applied to any collection of discrete entities, including abstract concepts such as ideas or dreams. The order-irrelevance principle states that the order in which objects are counted does not alter the total.

An important question concerns how children acquire the meaning of individual number words. Evidence from the Give-a-number task suggests that young children gradually learn the exact meaning of number words.

== Counting in mathematics ==
In mathematics, the essence of counting a set and finding a result n, is that it establishes a one-to-one correspondence (or bijection) of the subject set with the subset of positive integers {1, 2, ..., n}. A fundamental fact, which can be proved by mathematical induction, is that no bijection can exist between {1, 2, ..., n} and {1, 2, ..., m} unless n = m; this fact (together with the fact that two bijections can be composed to give another bijection) ensures that counting the same set in different ways can never result in different numbers (unless an error is made). This is the fundamental mathematical theorem that gives counting its purpose; however you count a (finite) set, the answer is the same. In a broader context, the theorem is an example of a theorem in the mathematical field of (finite) combinatorics—hence (finite) combinatorics is sometimes referred to as "the mathematics of counting".

Many sets that arise in mathematics do not allow a bijection to be established with {1, 2, ..., n} for any natural number n; these are called infinite sets, while those sets for which such a bijection does exist (for some n) are called finite sets. Infinite sets cannot be counted in the usual sense; for one thing, the mathematical theorems which underlie this usual sense for finite sets are false for infinite sets. Furthermore, different definitions of the concepts in terms of which these theorems are stated, while equivalent for finite sets, are inequivalent in the context of infinite sets.

The notion of counting may be extended to them in the sense of establishing (the existence of) a bijection with some well-understood set. For instance, if a set can be brought into bijection with the set of all natural numbers, then it is called "countably infinite". This kind of counting differs in a fundamental way from counting of finite sets, in that adding new elements to a set does not necessarily increase its size, because the possibility of a bijection with the original set is not excluded. For instance, the set of all integers (including negative numbers) can be brought into bijection with the set of natural numbers, and even seemingly much larger sets like that of all finite sequences of rational numbers are still (only) countably infinite. Nevertheless, there are sets, such as the set of real numbers, that can be shown to be "too large" to admit a bijection with the natural numbers, and these sets are called "uncountable". Sets for which there exists a bijection between them are said to have the same cardinality, and in the most general sense counting a set can be taken to mean determining its cardinality. Beyond the cardinalities given by each of the natural numbers, there is an infinite hierarchy of infinite cardinalities, although only very few such cardinalities occur in ordinary mathematics (that is, outside set theory that explicitly studies possible cardinalities).

Counting, mostly of finite sets, has various applications in mathematics. One important principle is that if two sets X and Y have the same finite number of elements, and a function f: X → Y is known to be injective, then it is also surjective, and vice versa. A related fact is known as the pigeonhole principle, which states that if two sets X and Y have finite numbers of elements n and m with n > m, then any map f: X → Y is not injective (so there exist two distinct elements of X that f sends to the same element of Y); this follows from the former principle, since if f were injective, then so would its restriction to a strict subset S of X with m elements, which restriction would then be surjective, contradicting the fact that for x in X outside S, f(x) cannot be in the image of the restriction. Similar counting arguments can prove the existence of certain objects without explicitly providing an example. In the case of infinite sets this can even apply in situations where it is impossible to give an example.

The domain of enumerative combinatorics deals with computing the number of elements of finite sets, without actually counting them; the latter usually being impossible because infinite families of finite sets are considered at once, such as the set of permutations of {1, 2, ..., n} for any natural number n.

== See also ==
- Calculation
- Card reading (bridge)
- Cardinal number
- Combinatorics
- Count data
- Counting (music)
- Counting problem (complexity)
- Counting sheep
- Counting-out game
- Developmental psychology
- Elementary arithmetic
- Finger counting
- History of mathematics
- Jeton
- Level of measurement
- List of numbers
- Mathematical quantity
- Ordinal number
- Particle number
- Subitizing and counting
- Tally mark
- Unary numeral system
- Yan tan tethera (Counting sheep in Britain)
