= Senary =

Base-6 numeral system

A senary (/ˈsiː.nər.i, ˈsɛn.ər.i/) numeral system (also known as base-6, heximal, or seximal) has six as its base. It has been adopted independently by a small number of cultures. Like the decimal base 10, the base is a semiprime, though it is unique as the product of the only two consecutive numbers that are both prime (2 and 3). As six is a superior highly composite number, many of the arguments made in favor of the duodecimal system also apply to the senary system.

== Formal definition ==
The standard set of digits in the senary system is $\mathcal{D}_6 = \lbrace 0, 1, 2, 3, 4, 5\rbrace$, with the linear order $0 < 1 < 2 < 3 < 4 < 5$. Let $\mathcal{D}_6^*$ be the Kleene closure of $\mathcal{D}_6$, where $ab$ is the operation of string concatenation for $a, b \in \mathcal{D}^*$. The senary number system for natural numbers $\mathcal{N}_6$ is the quotient set $\mathcal{D}_6^* / \sim$ equipped with a shortlex order, where the equivalence class $\sim$ is $\lbrace n \in \mathcal{D}_6^*, n \sim 0n \rbrace$. As $\mathcal{N}_6$ has a shortlex order, it is isomorphic to the natural numbers $\mathbb{N}$.

== Mathematical properties ==
Senary multiplication table
×	1	2	3	4	5	10
1	1	2	3	4	5	10
2	2	4	10	12	14	20
3	3	10	13	20	23	30
4	4	12	20	24	32	40
5	5	14	23	32	41	50
10	10	20	30	40	50	100

When expressed in senary, all prime numbers other than 2 and 3 have 1 or 5 as the final digit. In senary, the prime numbers are written:

2, 3, 5, 11, 15, 21, 25, 31, 35, 45, 51, 101, 105, 111, 115, 125, 135, 141, 151, 155, 201, 211, 215, 225, 241, 245, 251, 255, 301, 305, 331, 335, 345, 351, 405, 411, 421, 431, 435, 445, 455, 501, 515, 521, 525, 531, 551, ... (sequence A004680 in the OEIS)

That is, for every prime number p greater than 3, one has the modular arithmetic relations that either p ≡ 1 or 5 (mod 6) (that is, 6 divides either p − 1 or p − 5); the final digit is a 1 or a 5. This is proved by contradiction.

For any integer n:

- If n ≡ 0 (mod 6), 6 | n
- If n ≡ 2 (mod 6), 2 | n
- If n ≡ 3 (mod 6), 3 | n
- If n ≡ 4 (mod 6), 2 | n

Additionally, since the smallest four primes (2, 3, 5, 7) are either divisors or neighbors of 6, senary has simple divisibility tests for many numbers.

Furthermore, all even perfect numbers besides 6 have 44 as the final two digits when expressed in senary, which is proven by the fact that every even perfect number is of the form 2^{p – 1}(2^{p} – 1), where 2^{p} − 1 is prime.

Senary is also the largest number base r that has no totatives other than 1 and r − 1, making its multiplication table highly regular for its size, minimizing the amount of effort required to memorize its table. This property maximizes the probability that the result of an integer multiplication will end in zero, given that neither of its factors do.

If a number is divisible by 2, then the final digit of that number, when expressed in senary, is 0, 2, or 4. If a number is divisible by 3, then the final digit of that number in senary is 0 or 3. A number is divisible by 4 if its penultimate digit is odd and its final digit is 2, or its penultimate digit is even and its final digit is 0 or 4. A number is divisible by 5 if the sum of its senary digits is divisible by 5 (the equivalent of casting out nines in decimal). If a number is divisible by 6, then the final digit of that number is 0. To determine whether a number is divisible by 7, one can sum its alternate digits and subtract those sums; if the result is divisible by 7, the number is divisible by 7, similar to the "11" divisibility test in decimal.

== Fractions ==
Because six is the product of the first two prime numbers and is adjacent to the next two prime numbers, many senary fractions have simple representations. The table below shows fractional and positional representations in both decimal and senary, and has cells colored to indicate a certain level of complexity; Light grey cells indicate a rational number with a repeating cycle of length one or two, dark grey cells indicate a repeating cycle longer than two digits, and uncolored, white cells indicate no repeating cycle at all.

Decimal base Prime factors of the base: 2, 5 Prime factors of one below the base: 3 Prime factors of one above the base: 11			Senary base Prime factors of the base: 2, 3 Prime factors of one below the base: 5 Prime factors of one above the base: 7 (=11_{6})		
Fraction	Prime factors of the denominator	Positional representation	Positional representation	Prime factors of the denominator	Fraction
1/2	2	0.5	0.3	2	1/2
1/3	3	0.3333... = 0.3̅	0.2	3	1/3
1/4	2	0.25	0.13	2	1/4
1/5	5	0.2	0.1111... = 0.1̅	5	1/5
1/6	2, 3	0.16̅	0.1	2, 3	1/10
1/7	7	0.1̅4̅2̅8̅5̅7̅	0.0̅5̅	11	1/11
1/8	2	0.125	0.043	2	1/12
1/9	3	0.1̅	0.04	3	1/13
1/10	2, 5	0.1	0.03̅	2, 5	1/14
1/11	11	0.0̅9̅	0.0̅3̅1̅3̅4̅5̅2̅4̅2̅1̅	15	1/15
1/12	2, 3	0.083̅	0.03	2, 3	1/20
1/13	13	0.0̅7̅6̅9̅2̅3̅	0.0̅2̅4̅3̅4̅0̅5̅3̅1̅2̅1̅5̅	21	1/21
1/14	2, 7	0.07̅1̅4̅2̅8̅5̅	0.02̅3̅	2, 11	1/22
1/15	3, 5	0.06̅	0.02̅	3, 5	1/23
1/16	2	0.0625	0.0213	2	1/24
1/17	17	0.0̅5̅8̅8̅2̅3̅5̅2̅9̅4̅1̅1̅7̅6̅4̅7̅	0.0̅2̅0̅4̅1̅2̅2̅4̅5̅3̅5̅1̅4̅3̅3̅1̅	25	1/25
1/18	2, 3	0.05̅	0.02	2, 3	1/30
1/19	19	0.0̅5̅2̅6̅3̅1̅5̅7̅8̅9̅4̅7̅3̅6̅8̅4̅2̅1̅	0.0̅1̅5̅2̅1̅1̅3̅2̅5̅	31	1/31
1/20	2, 5	0.05	0.014̅	2, 5	1/32
1/21	3, 7	0.0̅4̅7̅6̅1̅9̅	0.01̅4̅	3, 11	1/33
1/22	2, 11	0.04̅5̅	0.01̅3̅4̅5̅2̅4̅2̅1̅0̅3̅	2, 15	1/34
1/23	23	0.0̅4̅3̅4̅7̅8̅2̅6̅0̅8̅6̅9̅5̅6̅5̅2̅1̅7̅3̅9̅1̅3̅	0.0̅1̅3̅2̅2̅0̅3̅0̅4̅4̅1̅	35	1/35
1/24	2, 3	0.0416̅	0.013	2, 3	1/40
1/25	5	0.04	0.0̅1̅2̅3̅5̅	5	1/41
1/26	2, 13	0.03̅8̅4̅6̅1̅5̅	0.01̅2̅1̅5̅0̅2̅4̅3̅4̅0̅5̅3̅	2, 21	1/42
1/27	3	0.0̅3̅7̅	0.012	3	1/43
1/28	2, 7	0.035̅7̅1̅4̅2̅8̅	0.011̅4̅	2, 11	1/44
1/29	29	0.0̅3̅4̅4̅8̅2̅7̅5̅8̅6̅2̅0̅6̅8̅9̅6̅5̅5̅1̅7̅2̅4̅1̅3̅7̅9̅3̅1̅	0.0̅1̅1̅2̅4̅0̅4̅5̅4̅4̅3̅1̅5̅1̅	45	1/45
1/30	2, 3, 5	0.03̅	0.01̅	2, 3, 5	1/50
1/31	31	0.0̅3̅2̅2̅5̅8̅0̅6̅4̅5̅1̅6̅1̅2̅9̅	0.0̅1̅0̅5̅4̅5̅	51	1/51
1/32	2	0.03125	0.01043	2	1/52
1/33	3, 11	0.0̅3̅	0.01̅0̅3̅1̅3̅4̅5̅2̅4̅2̅	3, 15	1/53
1/34	2, 17	0.02̅9̅4̅1̅1̅7̅6̅4̅7̅0̅5̅8̅8̅2̅3̅5̅	0.01̅0̅2̅0̅4̅1̅2̅2̅4̅5̅3̅5̅1̅4̅3̅3̅	2, 25	1/54
1/35	5, 7	0.02̅8̅5̅7̅1̅4̅	0.0̅1̅	5, 11	1/55
1/36	2, 3	0.027̅	0.01	2, 3	1/100

== Finger counting ==
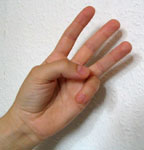
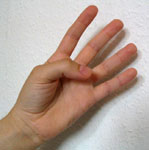
34_{senary} = 22_{decimal}, in senary finger counting

Each regular human hand may be said to have six unambiguous positions; a fist, one finger extended, two, three, four, and then all five fingers extended.

If the right hand is used to represent a unit (0 to 5), and the left to represent the multiples of 6, then it becomes possible for one person to represent the values from zero to 55_{senary} (35_{decimal}) with their fingers, rather than the usual ten obtained in standard finger counting. e.g. if three fingers are extended on the left hand and four on the right, 34_{senary} is represented. This is equivalent to 3 × 6 + 4, which is 22_{decimal}.

Additionally, this method is the least abstract way to count using two hands that reflects the concept of positional notation, as the movement from one position to the next is done by switching from one hand to another. While most developed cultures count by fingers up to 5 in very similar ways, beyond 5 non-Western cultures deviate from Western methods, such as with Chinese number gestures. As senary finger counting also deviates only beyond 5, this counting method rivals the simplicity of traditional counting methods, a fact which may have implications for the teaching of positional notation to young students.

Which hand is used for the 'sixes' and which the units is down to preference on the part of the counter; however, when viewed from the counter's perspective, using the left hand as the most significant digit correlates with the written representation of the same senary number. Flipping the 'sixes' hand around to its backside may help to further disambiguate which hand represents the 'sixes' and which represents the units. The downside to senary counting, however, is that without prior agreement two parties would be unable to utilize this system, being unsure which hand represents sixes and which hand represents ones, whereas decimal-based counting (with numbers beyond 5 being expressed by an open palm and additional fingers) being essentially a unary system only requires the other party to count the number of extended fingers.

In NCAA basketball, the players' uniform numbers are restricted to be senary numbers of at most two digits, so that the referees can signal which player committed an infraction by using this finger-counting system.

More abstract finger counting systems, such as chisanbop or finger binary, allow counting to 99, 1023, or even higher depending on the method (though not necessarily senary in nature). The English monk and historian Bede, described in the first chapter of his work De temporum ratione, (725), titled "Tractatus de computo, vel loquela per gestum digitorum," a system which allowed counting up to 9,999 on two hands.

== Natural languages ==
Despite the rarity of cultures that group large quantities by 6, a review of the development of numeral systems suggests a threshold of numerosity at 6 (possibly being conceptualized as "whole", "fist", or "beyond five fingers"), with 1–6 often being pure forms, and numerals thereafter being constructed or borrowed.

The Ndom language of Western New Guinea, Indonesia, is reported to have senary numerals. Mer means 6, mer an thef means 6 × 2 = 12, nif means 36, and nif thef means 36 × 2 = 72.

Another example from Papua New Guinea are the Yam languages. In these languages, counting is connected to ritualized yam-counting. These languages count from a base six, employing words for the powers of six; running up to 6^{6} for some of the languages. One example is Komnzo with the following numerals: nibo (6^{1}), fta (6^{2} [36]), taruba (6^{3} [216]), damno (6^{4} [1296]), wärämäkä (6^{5} [7776]), wi (6^{6} [46656]).

Some Niger–Congo languages have been reported to use a senary number system, usually in addition to another, such as decimal or vigesimal.

Proto-Uralic has also been suspected to have had senary numerals, with a numeral for 7 being borrowed later, though evidence for constructing larger numerals (8 and 9) subtractively from ten suggests that this may not be so.

== Base 36 as senary compression ==
For some purposes, senary might be too small a base for convenience. This can be worked around by using its square, base 36 (hexatrigesimal), as then conversion is facilitated by simply making the following replacements:

Decimal	0	1	2	3	4	5	6	7	8	9	10	11	12	13	14	15	16	17
Base 6	0	1	2	3	4	5	10	11	12	13	14	15	20	21	22	23	24	25
Base 36	0	1	2	3	4	5	6	7	8	9	A	B	C	D	E	F	G	H
Decimal	18	19	20	21	22	23	24	25	26	27	28	29	30	31	32	33	34	35
Base 6	30	31	32	33	34	35	40	41	42	43	44	45	50	51	52	53	54	55
Base 36	I	J	K	L	M	N	O	P	Q	R	S	T	U	V	W	X	Y	Z

Thus, the base-36 number WIKI_{36} is equal to the senary number 52303230_{6}. In decimal, it is 1,517,058.

The choice of 36 as a radix is convenient in that the digits can be represented using the Arabic numerals 0–9 and the Latin letters A–Z; this choice is the basis of the base36 encoding scheme. The compression effect of 36 being the square of 6 causes a lot of patterns and representations to be shorter in base 36:

1/9_{10} = 0.04_{6} = 0.4_{36}

1/16_{10} = 0.0213_{6} = 0.29_{36}

1/5_{10} = 0.1̅_{6} = 0.7̅_{36}

1/7_{10} = 0.0̅5̅_{6} = 0.5̅_{36}

== In fiction ==
The alien species known as Eridians from the Andy Weir sci-fi novel Project Hail Mary use a senary numeral system because they use 6 fingers for counting.

== See also ==
- Diceware method to encode base-6 values into pronounceable passwords.
- Base36 encoding scheme
- ADFGVX cipher to encrypt text into a series of effectively senary digits
