= Kahaniwali Nani =

Indian teacher and storyteller

Sarala Minni or more commonly known as Kahaniwali Nani, is a retired Indian teacher and storyteller based in Bangalore.

She graduated in Philosophy and Psychology. She worked as a montessori school teacher and ICMAS Abacus in Kolkata. She started storytelling on 21 March 2017, after being prompted by her niece Parul.

She started by telling stories in the Hindi language, and in April 2017 she started telling the stories in English. Her stories are targeted to age groups from would-be-mothers to children of ages 12. Using digital platform as a medium of communication, she spreads the value-based, festival related, folk tales, animal stories and other interactive stories of duration 8–11 minutes.

She currently uses YouTube and Telegram mobile applications to share the stories online.
