= Bi-quinary coded decimal =

Numeral encoding scheme

Biquinary code example

Reflected biquinary code

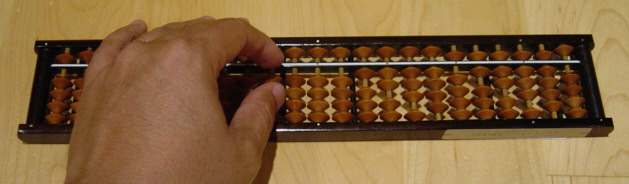
Japanese abacus. The right side represents 1,234,567,890 in bi-quinary: each column is one digit, with the lower beads representing "ones" and the upper beads "fives".

Bi-quinary coded decimal is a numeral encoding scheme used in many abacuses and in some early computers, notably the Colossus. The term bi-quinary indicates that the code comprises both a two-state (bi) and a five-state (quinary) component. The encoding resembles that used by many abacuses, with four beads indicating the five values either from 0 through 4 or from 5 through 9 and another bead indicating which of those ranges (which can alternatively be thought of as +5).

Several human languages, most notably Fula and Wolof also use biquinary systems. For example, the Fula word for 6, jowi e go'o, literally means five [plus] one. Roman numerals use a symbolic, rather than positional, bi-quinary base, even though Latin is completely decimal.

The Korean finger counting system Chisanbop uses a bi-quinary system, where each finger represents a one and a thumb represents a five, allowing one to count from 0 to 99 with two hands.

One advantage of a bi-quinary encoding scheme on digital computers is that it must have two bits set (one in the binary field and one in the quinary field), providing a built-in checksum to verify if the number is valid or not. (Stuck bits happened frequently with computers using mechanical relays.)

== Examples ==
Several different representations of bi-quinary coded decimal have been used by different machines. The two-state component is encoded as one or two bits, and the five-state component is encoded using three to five bits. Some examples are:

- Roman and Chinese abacuses
- Stibitz relay calculators at Bell Labs from Model II onwards
- FACOM 128 relay calculators at Fujitsu

=== IBM 650 ===
The IBM 650 uses seven bits: two bi bits (0 and 5) and five quinary bits (0, 1, 2, 3, 4), with error checking.

Exactly one bi bit and one quinary bit is set in a valid digit. The bi-quinary encoding of the internal workings of the machine are evident in the arrangement of its lights – the bi bits form the top of a T for each digit, and the quinary bits form the vertical stem.

Value	05-01234 bits	IBM 650 front panel while running, with active bits just discernible Close-up of IBM 650 indicators while running, with active bits visible
0	10-10000	IBM 650 front panel while running, with active bits just discernible Close-up of IBM 650 indicators while running, with active bits visible
1	10-01000	IBM 650 front panel while running, with active bits just discernible Close-up of IBM 650 indicators while running, with active bits visible
2	10-00100	IBM 650 front panel while running, with active bits just discernible Close-up of IBM 650 indicators while running, with active bits visible
3	10-00010	IBM 650 front panel while running, with active bits just discernible Close-up of IBM 650 indicators while running, with active bits visible
4	10-00001	IBM 650 front panel while running, with active bits just discernible Close-up of IBM 650 indicators while running, with active bits visible
5	01-10000	IBM 650 front panel while running, with active bits just discernible Close-up of IBM 650 indicators while running, with active bits visible
6	01-01000	IBM 650 front panel while running, with active bits just discernible Close-up of IBM 650 indicators while running, with active bits visible
7	01-00100	IBM 650 front panel while running, with active bits just discernible Close-up of IBM 650 indicators while running, with active bits visible
8	01-00010	IBM 650 front panel while running, with active bits just discernible Close-up of IBM 650 indicators while running, with active bits visible
9	01-00001	IBM 650 front panel while running, with active bits just discernible Close-up of IBM 650 indicators while running, with active bits visible

=== Remington Rand 409 ===
The Remington Rand 409 has five bits: one quinary bit (tube) for each of 1, 3, 5, and 7 - only one of these would be on at the time. The fifth bi bit represented 9 if none of the others were on; otherwise it added 1 to the value represented by the other quinary bit. The machine was sold in the two models UNIVAC 60 and UNIVAC 120.

Value	1357-9 bits
0	0000-0
1	1000-0
2	1000-1
3	0100-0
4	0100-1
5	0010-0
6	0010-1
7	0001-0
8	0001-1
9	0000-1

=== UNIVAC Solid State ===
The UNIVAC Solid State uses four bits: one bi bit (5), three binary coded quinary bits (4 2 1) and one parity check bit

Value	p-5-421 bits
0	1-0-000
1	0-0-001
2	0-0-010
3	1-0-011
4	0-0-100
5	0-1-000
6	1-1-001
7	1-1-010
8	0-1-011
9	1-1-100

=== UNIVAC LARC ===
The UNIVAC LARC has four bits: one bi bit (5), three Johnson counter-coded quinary bits and one parity check bit.

Value	p-5-qqq bits
0	1-0-000
1	0-0-001
2	1-0-011
3	0-0-111
4	1-0-110
5	0-1-000
6	1-1-001
7	0-1-011
8	1-1-111
9	0-1-110

== See also ==
- Binary-coded decimal – System of digitally encoding numbers
- Binary number
- Chisanbop
- Decimal computer – Computer operating on base-10 numbers
- FACOM 128
- Finger binary
- Quinary
- Two-out-of-five code
