= Finger-counting =

Multi-cultural system of counting directly involving the digits

Woman counts to ten in English, using her fingers.

Finger-counting or dactylonomy is counting using the fingers. Various systems have existed over time and across cultures, although many have declined in use because of the spread of Arabic numerals.

Finger-counting can serve as a form of manual communication, particularly in marketplace trading – including hand signaling during open outcry in floor trading – and also in hand games, such as morra.

Finger-counting goes back to ancient Egypt at least. (Note: Neugebauer 1952, p. 9 notes that as early as the 3rd millennium BCE, in Egypt's Old Kingdom, in the Pyramid Texts' "Spell for obtaining a ferry-boat", the ferryman might object "Did you bring me a man who cannot number his fingers?". This spell was needed to cross a canal of the nether-world, as detailed in the Book of the Dead.)

== Historical counting ==
Archaeologists and historians have found evidence of finger-counting in all times and all regions of the world. In one hadith, Muhammad enjoined his female companions to count using their fingers واعقدن بالأنامل.

The polymath Al-Jahiz advised schoolmasters in his book Al-Bayan (البيان والتبيين) to teach finger counting which he placed among the five methods of human expression. Similarly, Al-Suli, in his Handbook for Secretaries, wrote that scribes preferred finger-counting to any other system because it required neither materials nor an instrument, apart from a limb. Furthermore, it ensured secrecy and was thus in keeping with the dignity of the scribe's profession.

Books dealing with finger-counting, such as a treatise by the mathematician Abu'l-Wafa al-Buzajani, gave rules for performing complex operations, including the approximate determination of square roots. Several pedagogical poems dealt exclusively with finger counting, some of which were translated into European languages, including a short poem by Shamsuddeen Al-Mawsili and one by Abul-Hasan Al-Maghribi.

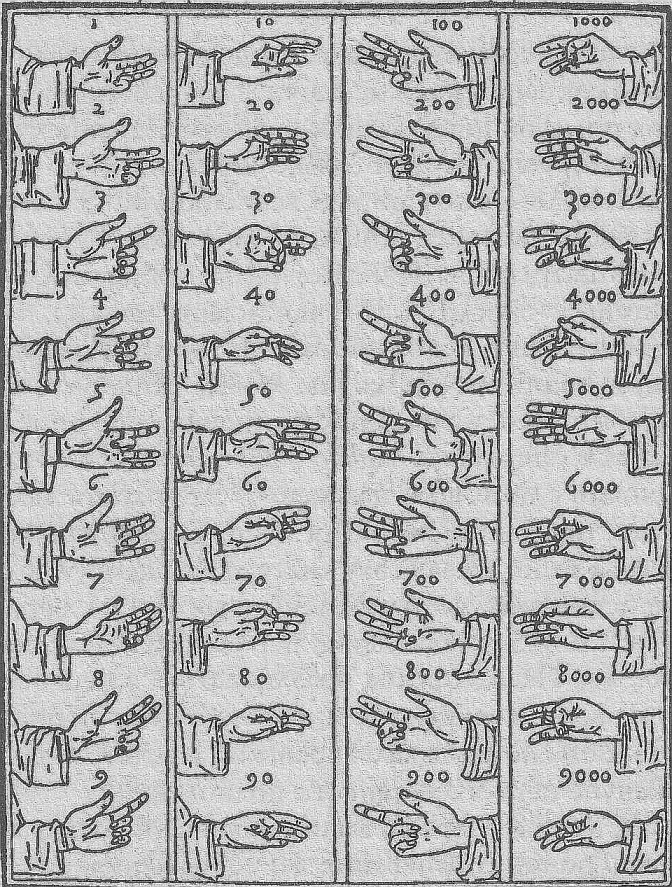
Finger positions used for counting up to 9999 from Luca Pacioli's 1494 Summa de arithmetica, based on the earlier Roman system.

One ancient and widespread finger-counting system is the elaborate sign language–like method which is described in The Reckoning of Time, an eight-century English treatise, and in Farhang-i Jahangiri, a seventeenth-century Persian dictionary. In this system, the little finger, ring finger, and middle finger are used to count from 1 to 9, and the thumb and index finger are used to count by tens from 10 to 90, such that a single hand can count up to 99. The opposite hand is used to count by hundreds in the same manner, such that with both hands, one can count up to 9999.

Various Arab authors cite Ancient Egypt as the source of this technique. This is supported by a number of funeral paintings from the Old Kingdom of Egypt in which people seem to display numbers on their hands according to this method.

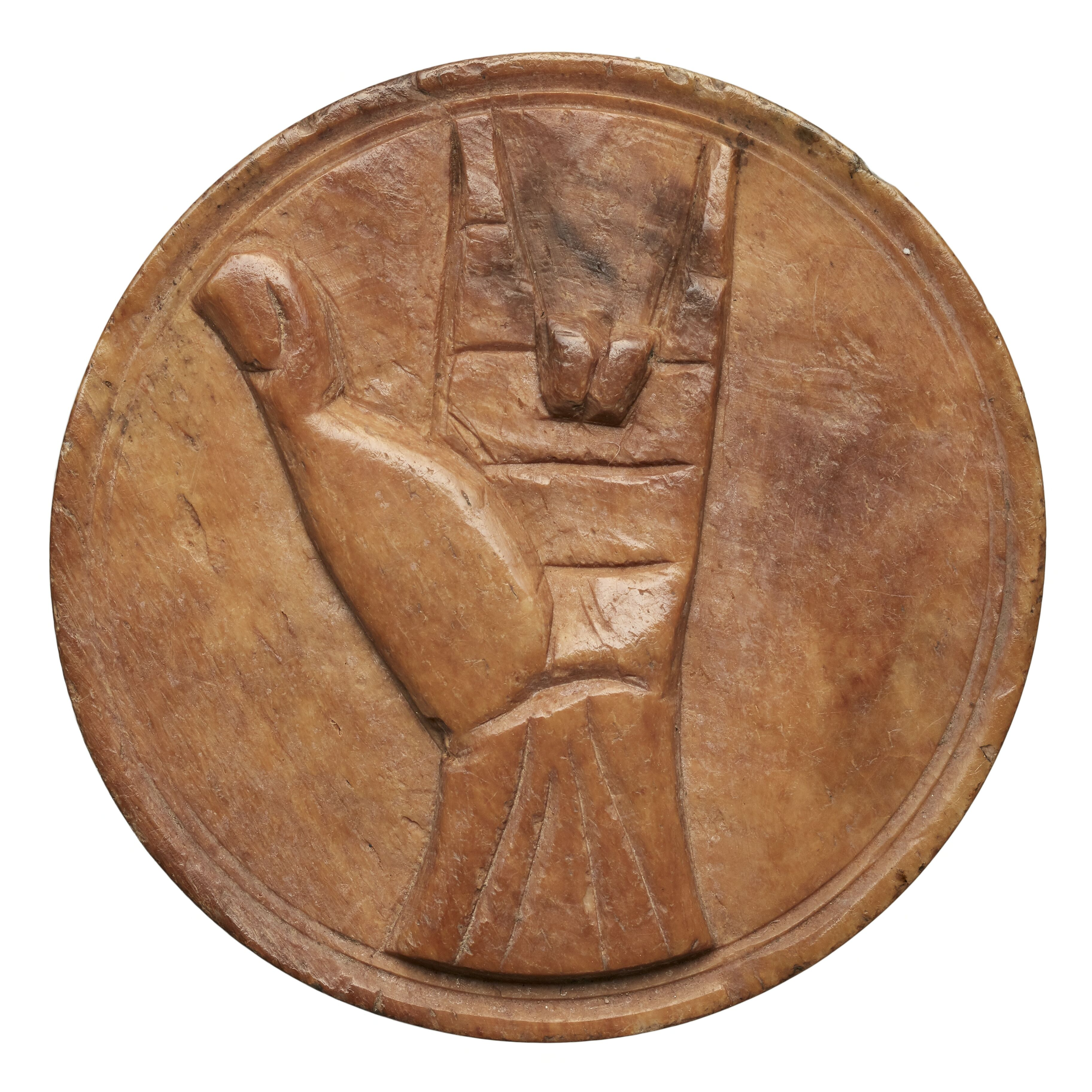
Roman tessera with finger gesture for 4. The numeral "IIII" is depicted on the reverse side.

In the Roman Empire, this system is mentioned starting in the 3rd century BCE, but not described in detail. However, it appears in various media, such as tesserae and sculptural reliefs. This system remained in use through the European Middle Ages, being presented in slightly modified form by Luca Pacioli in his Summa de arithmetica (1494).

Plutarch's Lives says that a finger-counting system going up to 10000 was also used in Persia in the first centuries CE.

The same system (using the opposite hand) was also used in the Islamic world. For example, poets could allude to a miser by saying that his hand made "ninety-three", i.e. a closed fist, the sign of avarice. When an old man was asked how old he was he could answer by showing a closed fist, meaning 93. The gesture for 50 was used by some poets (for example Ibn Al-Moutaz) to describe the beak of the goshawk. Some of the gestures had special technical terms such as Kas' (القصع) '29', Dabth (الـضَـبْـث) '63' and Daff (الـضَـفّ) for '99' (فقه اللغة).

== By country or region ==
Finger-counting is studied by ethnomathematics. Cultural differences are sometimes used as a shibboleth, particularly to distinguish nationalities in war time. These form a plot point in the film Inglourious Basterds, by Quentin Tarantino, and in the book Pi in the Sky, by John D. Barrow.

=== South and West Asia ===
In mainland Southeast Asia, South Asia, West Asia, and Egypt, the commonly used system allows for counting to 12 using a single hand. The thumb acts as a pointer touching the three finger bones of each finger in turn, starting with the outermost bone of the little finger. One hand is used to count numbers up to 12. The other hand is used to display the number of completed dozens, either using the same method (allowing one to count up to 144) or by closing down each of the five fingers in turn (allowing one to count up to 60).

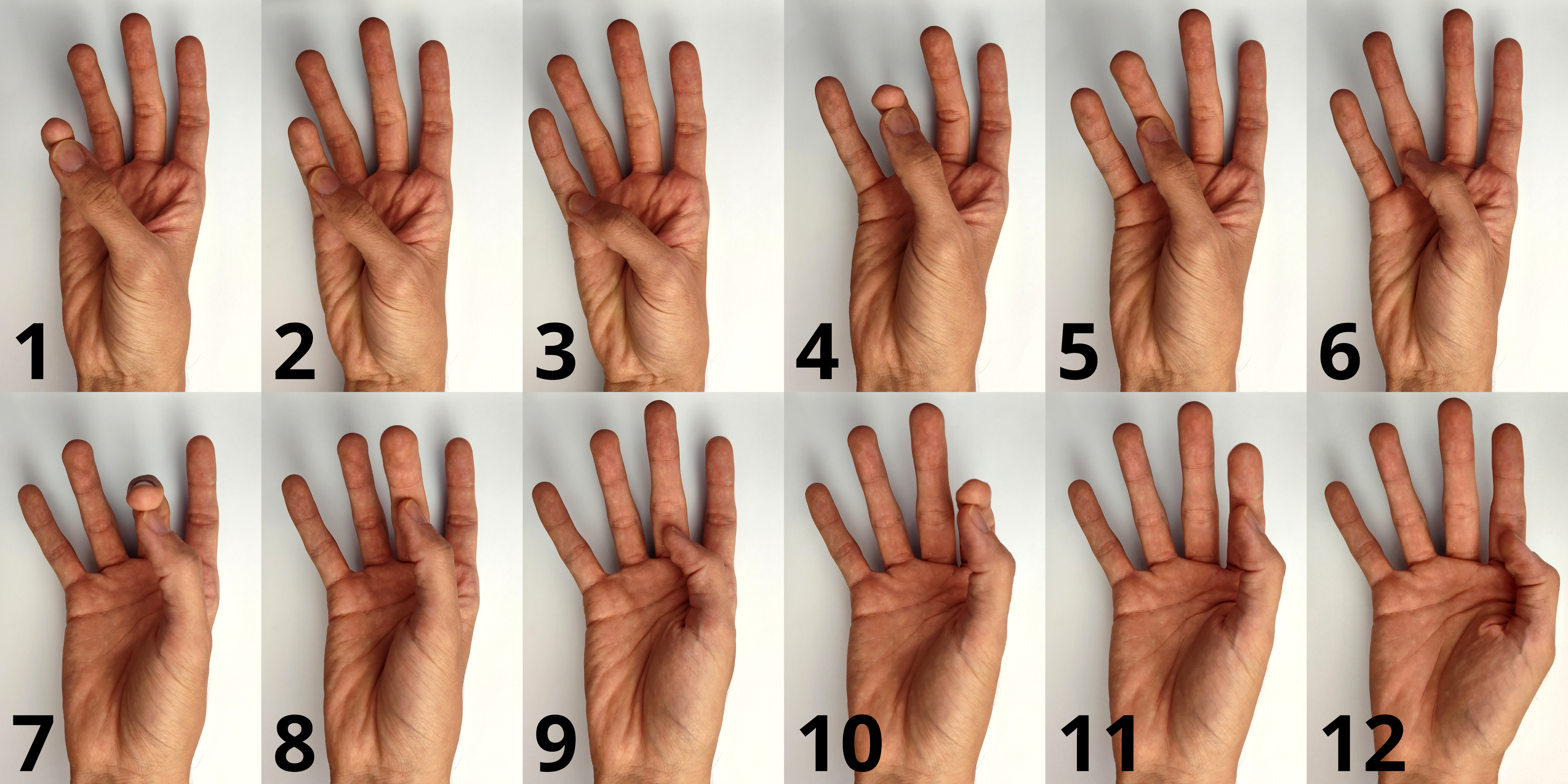
The South and West Asian method of counting to 12 on one hand

In southern China, mainland South East Asia, and South Asia, the index finger of the other hand is sometimes used for pointing instead of the thumb. This allows the two bones of the thumb to be used as well, allowing one to count up to 14 on one hand and 28 on both hands.

In northeastern India and Bangladesh, another variation is used in which the joints of the fingers are used rather than the bones. If one includes the three joints of the thumb, this allows one to count up to 15 on one hand. In the rest of the Islamic world, a similar but rarely used method uses the tips of three of the fingers as well, allowing one to count up to 33 on both hands (used for reciting the 99 attributes of God).

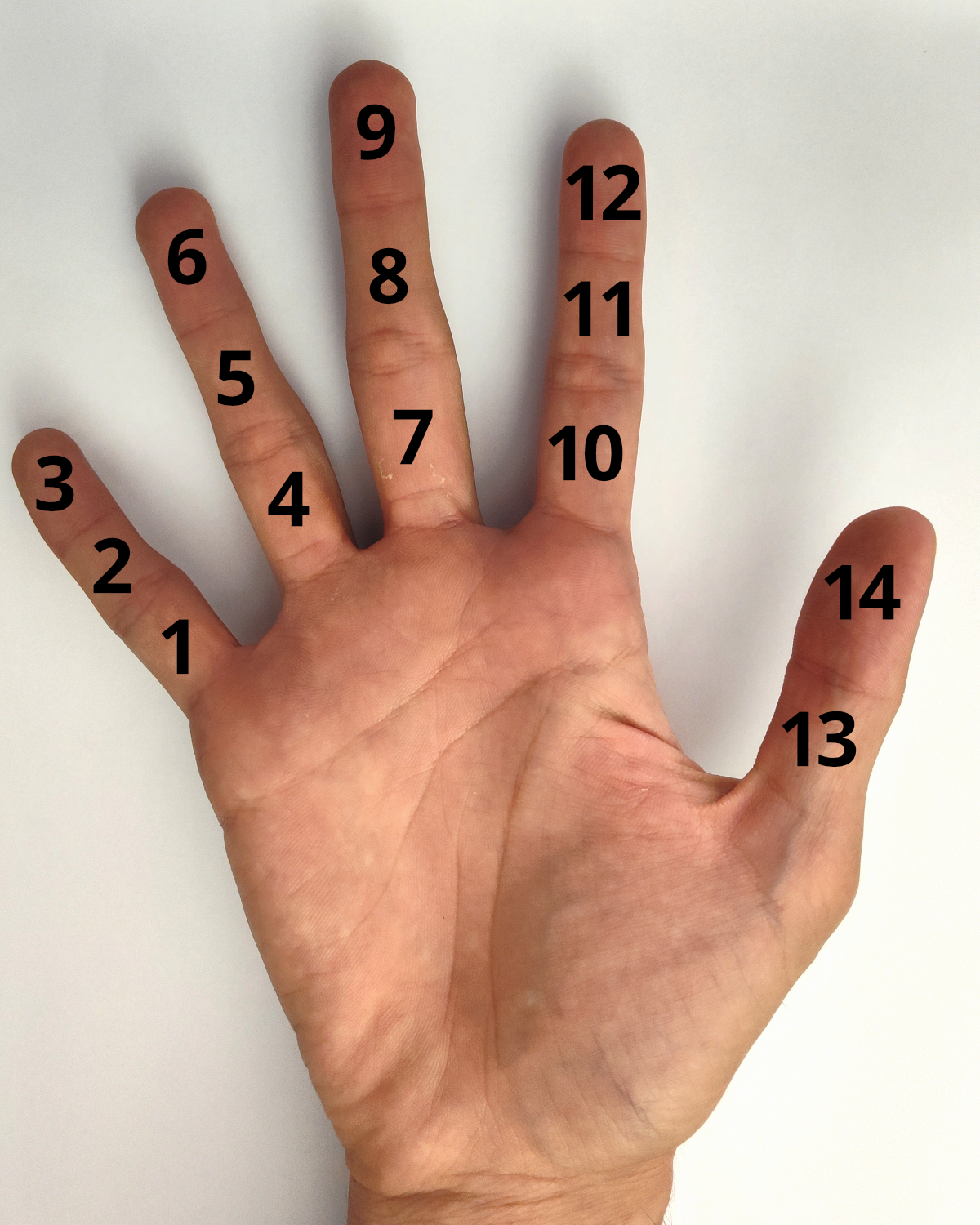
The East and South Asian method of counting to 14 on one hand

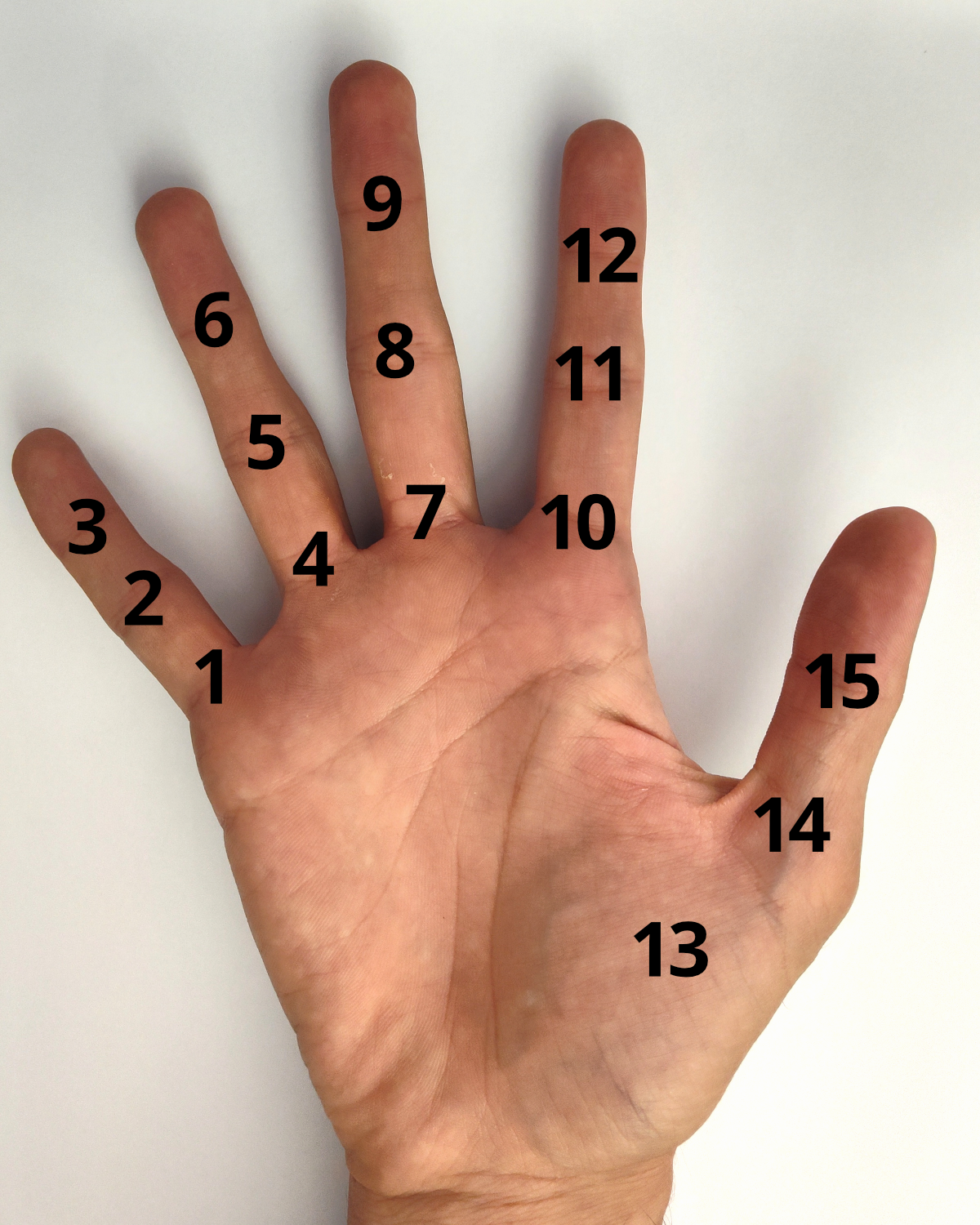
The method of northeastern India and Bangladesh for counting to 15 on one hand

=== East Asia ===
Chinese number gestures count up to 10 but can exhibit some regional differences.

In Japan, counting for oneself begins with the palm of one hand open. Like in East Slavic countries, the thumb represents number 1; the little finger is number 5. Digits are folded inwards while counting, starting with the thumb. A closed palm indicates number 5. By reversing the action, number 6 is indicated by extending the little finger. A return to an open palm signals the number 10. However to indicate numerals to others, the hand is used in the same manner as an English speaker. The index finger becomes number 1; the thumb now represents number 5. For numbers above five, the appropriate number of fingers from the other hand are placed against the palm. For example, number 7 is represented by the index and middle finger pressed against the palm of the open hand. Number 10 is displayed by presenting both hands open with outward palms.

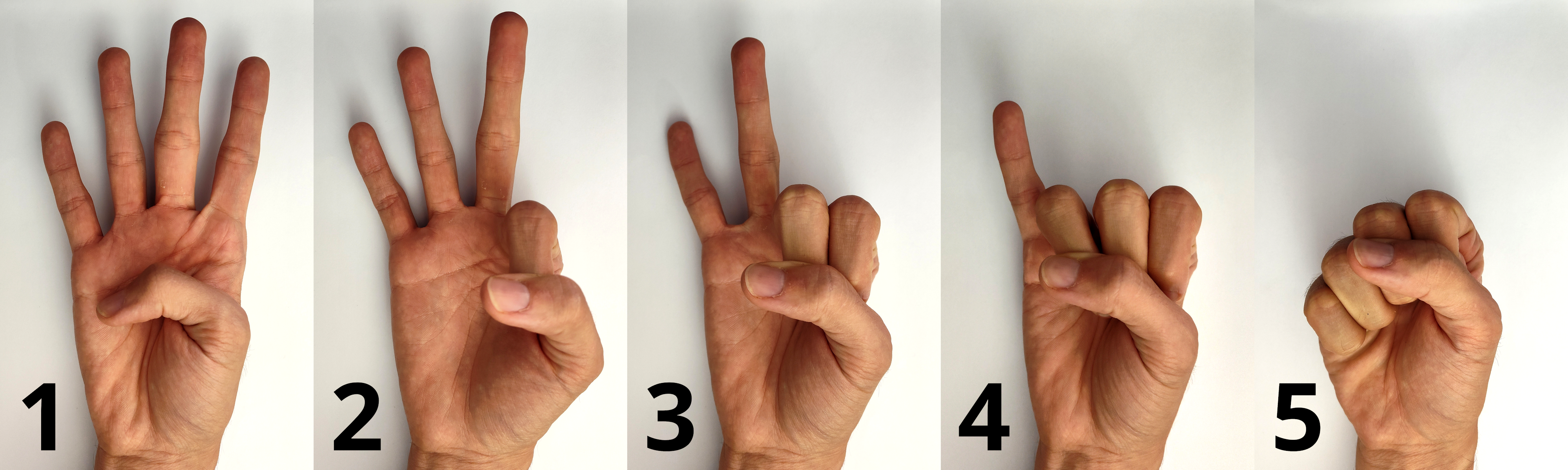
The Japanese system for counting to 5 on one hand. Repeating the sequence in reverse represents a count to 10.

In Korea, Chisanbop allows for signing any number between 0 and 99.

=== Western world ===
In the Western world a finger is raised for each unit. While there are extensive differences between and even within countries, there are, generally speaking, two systems. The main difference between the two systems is that the "German" or "French" system starts counting with the thumb, while the "American" system starts counting with the index finger.

In the system used for example in Germany and France, the thumb represents 1, the thumb plus the index finger represents 2, and so on, until the thumb plus the index, middle, ring, and little fingers represents 5. This continues on to the other hand, where the entire one hand plus the thumb of the other hand means 6, and so on.

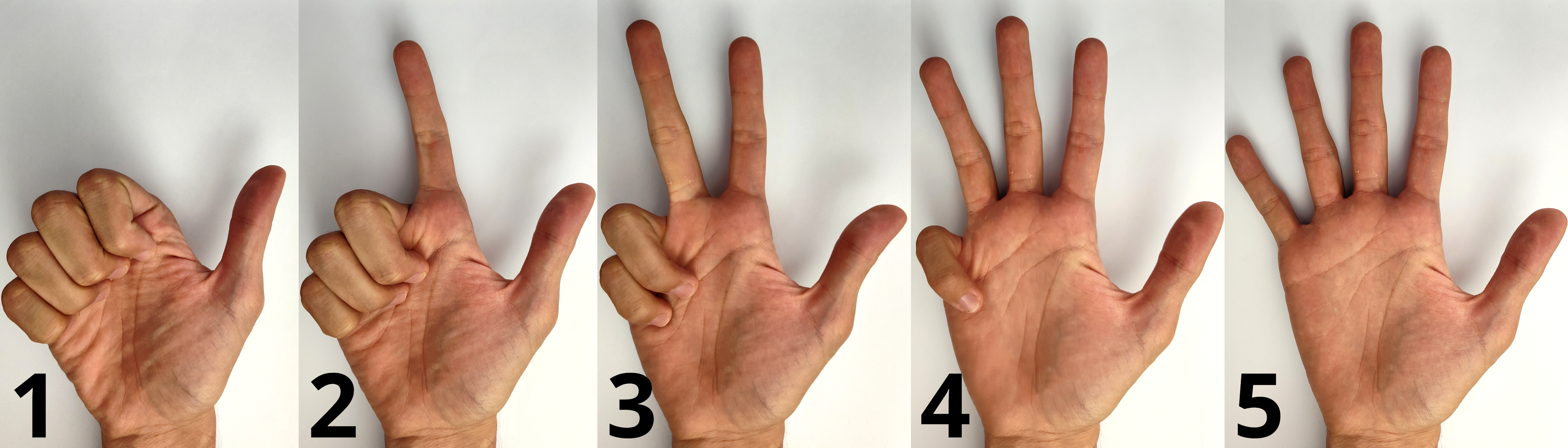
The German and French system for counting to 5 on one hand

In the system used in the Americas, the index finger represents 1; the index and middle fingers represents 2; the index, middle and ring fingers represents 3; the index, middle, ring, and little fingers represents 4; and the four fingers plus the thumb represents 5. This continues on to the other hand, where the entire one hand plus the index finger of the other hand means 6, and so on.

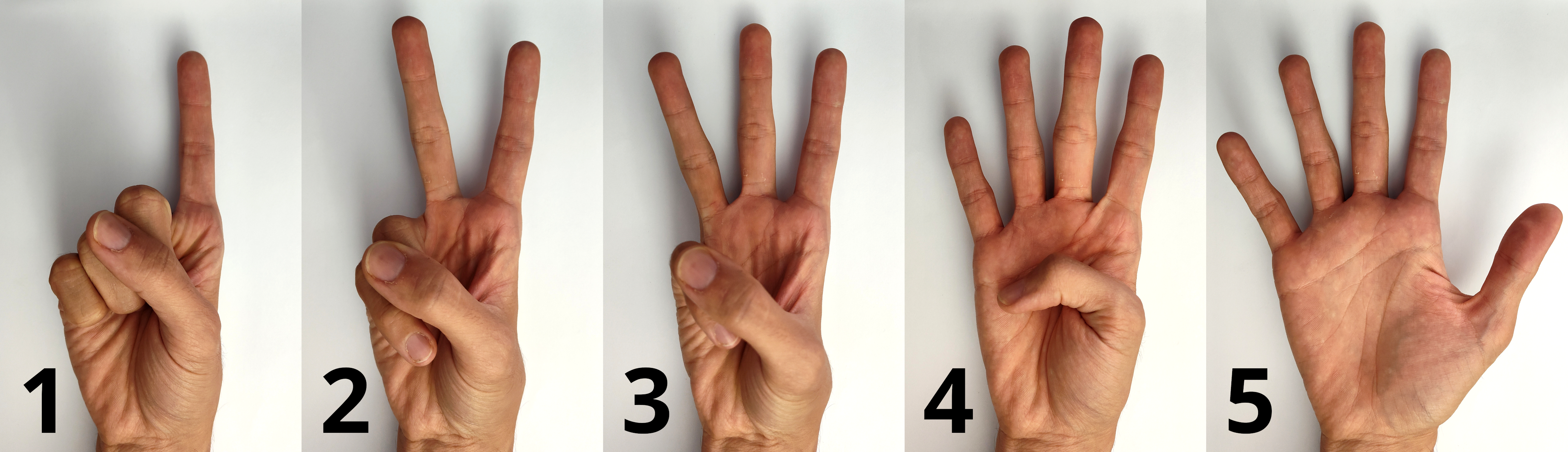
The American system for counting to 5 on one hand

In the United Kingdom, counting starting with the thumb and counting starting with the index finger are both equally acceptable.

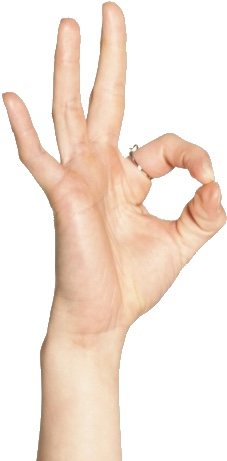
The "OK" or "zero" gesture

The OK gesture stands for "zero" meaning "worth nothing" in France and Tunisia, but is an obscene gesture in some other cultures.

== Non-decimal finger counting ==
In finger binary (base 2), each finger represents a different bit, for example thumb for 1, index for 2, middle for 4, ring for 8, and pinky for 16. This allows counting from zero to 31 using the fingers of one hand, or 1023 using both.

In senary finger counting (base 6), one hand represents the units (0 to 5) and the other hand represents multiples of 6. It counts up to 55_{senary} (35_{decimal}). Two related representations can be expressed: wholes and sixths (counts up to 5.5 by sixths), sixths and thirty-sixths (counts up to 0.55 by thirty-sixths). For example, "12" (left 1 right 2) can represent eight (12 senary), four-thirds (1.2 senary) or two-ninths (0.12 senary).

== Other body-based counting systems ==
Undoubtedly the decimal (base-10) counting system came to prominence due to the widespread use of finger counting, but many other counting systems have been used throughout the world. Likewise, base-20 counting systems, such as used by the Pre-Columbian Mayan, are likely due to counting on fingers and toes. This is suggested in the languages of Central Brazilian tribes, where the word for twenty often incorporates the word for "feet". Other languages using a base-20 system often refer to twenty in terms of "men", that is, 1 "man" = 20 "fingers and toes". For instance, the Dene-Dinje tribe of North America refer to 5 as "my hand dies", 10 as "my hands have died", 15 as "my hands are dead and one foot is dead", and 20 as "a man dies".

The French language today shows remnants of a Gaulish base-20 system in the names of the numbers from 60 through 99. For example, sixty-five is soixante-cinq (literally, "sixty [and] five"), while seventy-five is soixante-quinze (literally, "sixty [and] fifteen"). Eighty is quatre-vingt (literally "four (times) twenty"). Ninety is quatre-vingt-dix (literally "four (times) twenty (and) ten").

The Danish language uses the words tres and firs and 60 and 80. These are shorter forms of the older words tresindstyve and firsindstyve which means three times twenty and four times twenty. Further, 50, 70 and 90 are halvtreds, halvfirs and halvfems, where the prefix halv means half and refers to that half of twenty is subtracted.

The Yuki language in California and the Pamean languages in Mexico have octal (base-8) systems because the speakers count using the spaces between their fingers rather than the fingers themselves. More specifically, the Yuki were described as counting using sticks placed between the fingers.

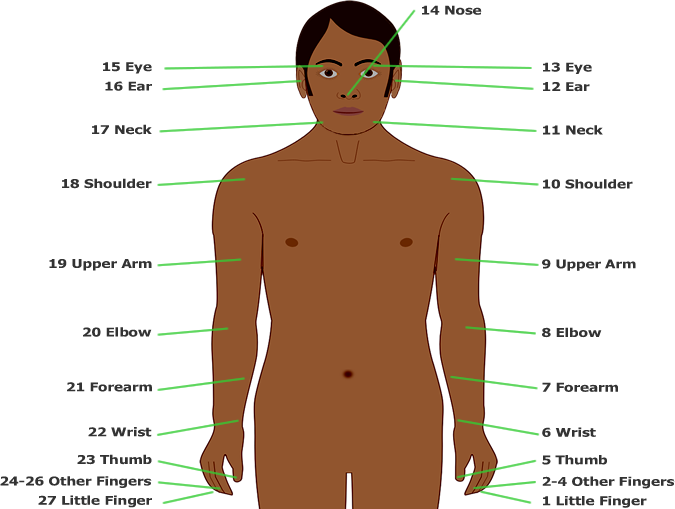
Counting to 27 with the body-part tally used by the Sibil Valley people of Western New Guinea

In languages of New Guinea and Australia, such as the Telefol language of Papua New Guinea, body counting is used, to give higher base counting systems, up to base-27. In Muralug Island, the counting system works as follows: Starting with the little finger of the left hand, count each finger, then for six through ten, successively touch and name the left wrist, left elbow, left shoulder, left breast and sternum. Then for eleven through to nineteen count the body parts in reverse order on the right side of the body (with the right little finger signifying nineteen). A variant among the Papuans of New Guinea uses on the left, the fingers, then the wrist, elbow, shoulder, left ear and left eye. Then on the right, the eye, nose, mouth, right ear, shoulder, wrist and finally, the fingers of the right hand, adding up to 22 anusi which means little finger.

== See also ==
- History of mathematics
- Knuckle mnemonic
- Prehistoric numerals
- Tally marks
