= Abacus =

Calculating tool

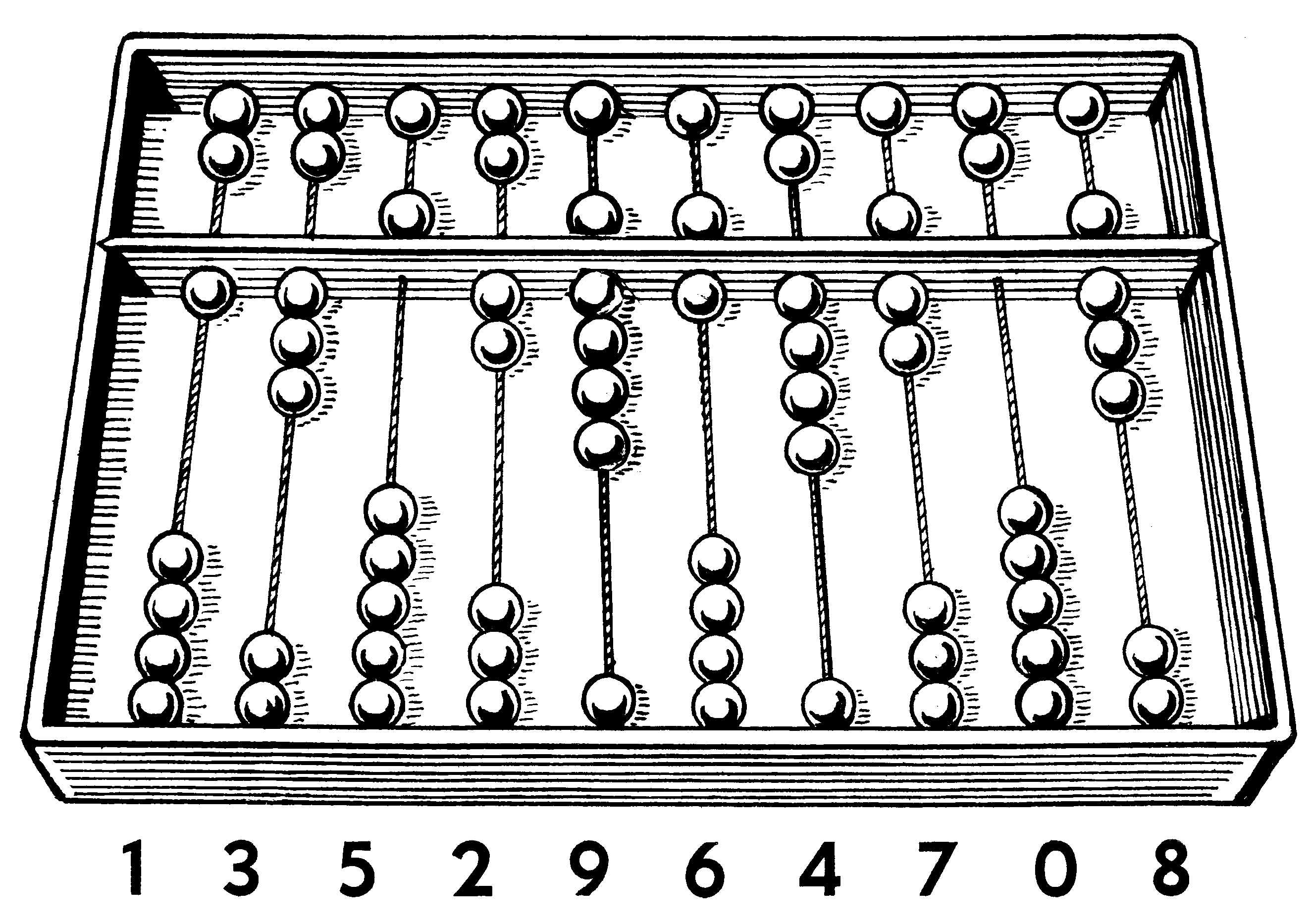
Bi-quinary coded decimal-like abacus representing 1,352,964,708

An abacus (pl. abaci or abacuses), also called a counting frame, is a hand-operated calculating tool which was used from ancient times, in the ancient Near East, Europe, China, and Russia, until largely replaced by handheld electronic calculators during the 1980s, with some ongoing attempts to revive their use. An abacus consists of a two-dimensional array of slidable beads (or similar objects). In their earliest designs, the beads could be loose on a flat surface or sliding in grooves. Later the beads were made to slide on rods and built into a frame, allowing faster manipulation.

Each rod typically represents one digit of a multi-digit number laid out using a positional numeral system such as base ten (though some cultures used different numerical bases). Roman and East Asian abacuses use a system resembling bi-quinary coded decimal, with a top deck (containing one or two beads) representing fives and a bottom deck (containing four or five beads) representing ones. Natural numbers are normally used, but some allow simple fractional components (e.g. 1/2, 1/4, and 1/12 in Roman abacus), and a decimal point can be imagined for fixed-point arithmetic.

Any particular abacus design supports multiple methods to perform calculations, including addition, subtraction, multiplication, division, and square roots and cube roots. The beads are first arranged to represent a number, then are manipulated to perform a mathematical operation with another number, and their final position can be read as the result (or can be used as the starting number for subsequent operations).

In the ancient world, abacuses were a practical calculating tool. They were widely used in Europe as late as the 17th century, but fell out of use with the rise of decimal notation and algorismic methods. Although calculators and computers are commonly used today instead of abacuses, abacuses remain in everyday use in some countries. The abacus has an advantage of not requiring a writing implement and paper (needed for algorism) or an electric power source. Merchants, traders, and clerks in some parts of Eastern Europe, Russia, China, and Africa use abacuses. The abacus remains in common use as a scoring system in non-electronic table games. Others may use an abacus due to visual impairment that prevents the use of a calculator. The abacus is still used to teach the fundamentals of mathematics to children in many countries such as Japan and China.

== Etymology ==
The word abacus dates to at least 1387 AD when a Middle English work borrowed the word from Latin that described a sandboard abacus. The Latin word is derived from ancient Greek ἄβαξ (abax) which means something without a base, and colloquially, any piece of rectangular material. Alternatively, without reference to ancient texts on etymology, it has been suggested that it means "a square tablet strewn with dust", or "drawing-board covered with dust (for the use of mathematics)"; the exact shape of the Latin perhaps reflects the genitive form of the Greek word, ἄβακoς (abakos). While the table strewn with dust definition is popular, some argue evidence is insufficient for that conclusion. (Note: Both C. J. Gadd, a keeper of the Egyptian and Assyrian Antiquities at the British Museum, and Jacob Levy, a Jewish historian who wrote Neuhebräisches und chaldäisches wörterbuch über die Talmudim und Midraschim [Neuhebräisches and Chaldean dictionary on the Talmuds and Midrashi], disagree with the "dust table" theory.) Greek ἄβαξ probably borrowed from a Northwest Semitic language like Phoenician, evidenced by a cognate with the Hebrew word ʾābāq (אבק), or "dust" (in the post-Biblical sense "sand used as a writing surface").

Both abacuses and abaci are used as plurals. The user of an abacus is called an abacist.

== History ==
=== Ancient Near East ===
==== Mesopotamia ====
The Sumerian abacus appeared between 2700 and 2300 BC. It held a table of successive columns which delimited the successive orders of magnitude of their sexagesimal (base 60) number system. Primitive forms of the abacus existed in Sumer, such as the non-fixed bead abacus, a line of strings fixed to a board, counting strings consisting of beads (similar to prayer beads and pace count beads), ropes and knots, and counting boards (similar to tally sticks). The exact form and function of these devices are scattered around different sources, and their exact relation to the modern abacus is unknown but it is almost certain there is a relationship with masihatu, which functioned similarly to an abacus utilizing multiple strings and sets of beads.

Some scholars point to a character in Babylonian cuneiform that may have been derived from a representation of the abacus. It is the belief of Old Babylonian scholars, such as Ettore Carruccio, that Old Babylonians "seem to have used the abacus for the operations of addition and subtraction; however, this primitive device proved difficult to use for more complex calculations".

==== Egypt ====
Greek historian Herodotus mentioned the abacus in Ancient Egypt. He wrote that the Egyptians manipulated the pebbles from right to left, opposite in direction to the Greek left-to-right method. Archaeologists have found ancient disks of various sizes that are thought to have been used as counters. However, there are no known illustrations of this device.

==== Persia ====
At around 600 BC, Persians first began to use the abacus during the Achaemenid Empire. Under the Parthians, Sasanians, as well as later succeeding empires, scholars concentrated on exchanging knowledge and inventions with the countries around them — India, China, and the Roman Empire — which is how the abacus may have been exported to other countries.

=== Europe ===
==== Greece ====
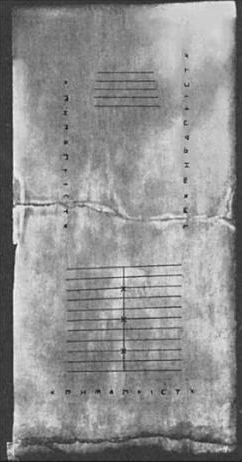
An early photograph of the Salamis Tablet.

The earliest archaeological evidence for the use of the Greek abacus dates to the 5th century BC. Demosthenes (384–322 BC) complained that the need to use pebbles for calculations was too difficult. A play by Alexis from the 4th century BC mentions an abacus and pebbles for accounting, and both Diogenes and Polybius use the abacus as a metaphor for human behavior, stating "that men that sometimes stood for more and sometimes for less" like the pebbles on an abacus. The Greek abacus was a table of wood or marble, pre-set with small counters in wood or metal for mathematical calculations. This Greek abacus was used in Achaemenid Persia, the Etruscan civilization, Ancient Rome, and the Western Christian world until the French Revolution.

The Salamis Tablet, found on the Greek island Salamis in 1846 AD, dates to 300 BC, making it the oldest counting board discovered so far. It is a slab of white marble 149 cm (59 in) in length, 75 cm (30 in) wide, and 4.5 cm (2 in) thick, on which are 5 groups of markings. In the tablet's center is a set of 5 parallel lines equally divided by a vertical line, capped with a semicircle at the intersection of the bottom-most horizontal line and the single vertical line. Below these lines is a wide space with a horizontal crack dividing it. Below this crack is another group of eleven parallel lines, again divided into two sections by a line perpendicular to them, but with the semicircle at the top of the intersection; the third, sixth and ninth of these lines are marked with a cross where they intersect with the vertical line. Also from this time frame, the Darius Vase was unearthed in 1851. It was covered with pictures, including a "treasurer" holding a wax tablet in one hand while manipulating counters on a table with the other.

==== Rome ====
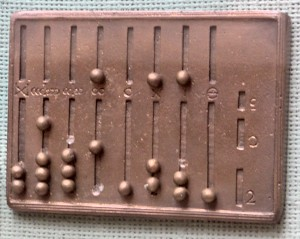
Copy of a Roman abacus

The normal method of calculation in ancient Rome, as in Greece, was by moving counters on a smooth table. Originally pebbles (Latin: calculi) were used. Marked lines indicated units, fives, tens, etc. as in the Roman numeral system.

Writing in the 1st century BC, Horace refers to the wax abacus, a board covered with a thin layer of black wax on which columns and figures were inscribed using a stylus.

One example of archaeological evidence of the Roman abacus, shown nearby in reconstruction, dates to the 1st century AD. It has eight long grooves containing up to five beads in each and eight shorter grooves having either one or no beads in each. The groove marked I indicates units, X tens, and so on up to millions. The beads in the shorter grooves denote fives (five units, five tens, etc.) resembling a bi-quinary coded decimal system related to the Roman numerals. The short grooves on the right may have been used for marking Roman "ounces" (i.e. fractions).

==== Medieval Europe ====
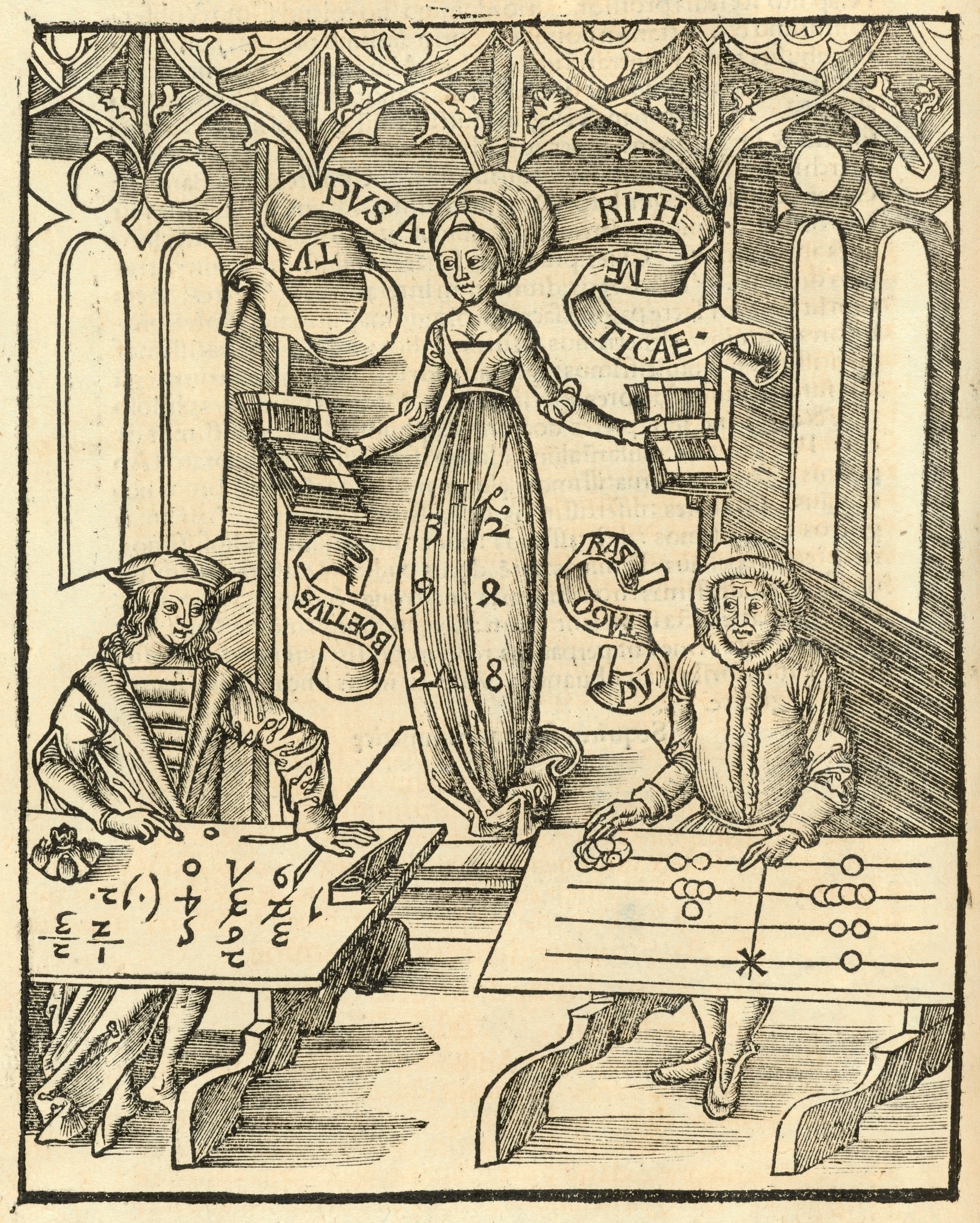
Use of an abacus, as illustrated in Margarita philosophica (1503)

The Roman system of 'counter casting' was used widely in medieval Europe, and persisted in limited use into the nineteenth century. Wealthy abacists used decorative minted counters, called jetons.

Due to Pope Sylvester II's reintroduction of the abacus with modifications, it became widely used in Europe again during the 11th century. It used beads on wires, unlike the traditional Roman counting boards, which meant the abacus could be used much faster and was more easily moved.

==== Russia ====
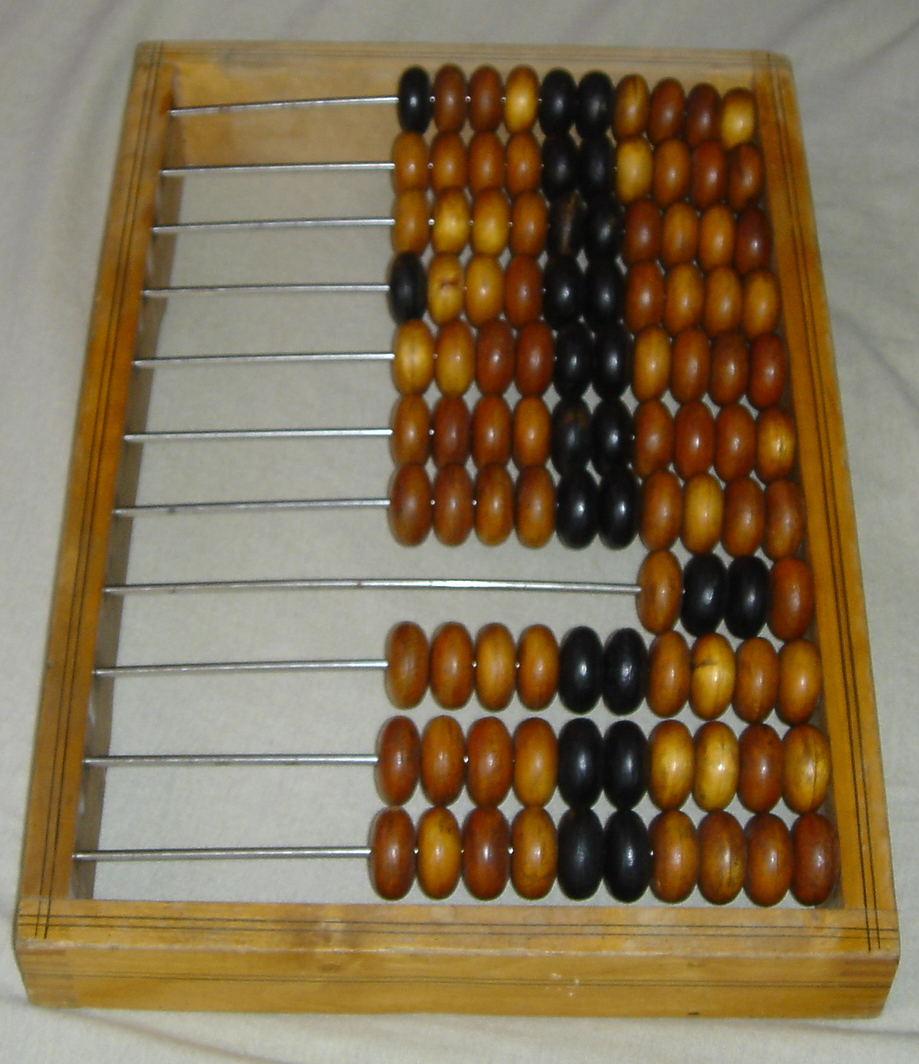
Russian schoty

The Russian abacus, the schoty (Russian: счёты, plural from Russian: счёт, counting), usually has a single slanted deck, with ten beads on each wire (except one wire with four beads for quarter-ruble fractions). 4-bead wire was introduced for quarter-kopeks, which were minted until 1916. The Russian abacus is used vertically, with each wire running horizontally. The wires are usually bowed upward in the center, to keep the beads pinned to either side. It is cleared when all the beads are moved to the right. During manipulation, beads are moved to the left. For easy viewing, the middle 2 beads on each wire (the 5th and 6th bead) usually are of a different color from the other eight. Likewise, the left bead of the thousands wire (and the million wire, if present) may have a different color.

The Russian abacus was in use in shops and markets throughout the former Soviet Union, and its usage was taught in most schools until the 1990s. Even the 1874 invention of mechanical calculator, Odhner arithmometer, had not replaced them in Russia. According to Yakov Perelman, some businessmen attempting to import calculators into the Russian Empire were known to leave in despair after watching a skilled abacus operator. Likewise, the mass production of Felix arithmometers since 1924 did not significantly reduce abacus use in the Soviet Union. The Russian abacus began to lose popularity only after the mass production of domestic microcalculators in 1974.

The Russian abacus was brought to France around 1820 by mathematician Jean-Victor Poncelet, who had served in Napoleon's army and had been a prisoner of war in Russia. To Poncelet's French contemporaries, it was something new. Poncelet used it, not for any applied purpose, but as a teaching and demonstration aid. The Turks and the Armenian people used abacuses similar to the Russian schoty. It was named a coulba by the Turks and a choreb by the Armenians.

=== East Asia ===
==== China ====
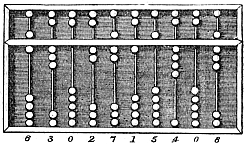
A Chinese abacus (suanpan) (the number represented in the picture is 6,302,715,408)

Abacus
- Traditional Chinese: 算盤
- Simplified Chinese: 算盘
- Literal meaning: "calculating tray"
Transcriptions
Standard Mandarin
- Hanyu Pinyin: suànpán
- IPA: [swân.pʰǎn]
Yue: Cantonese
- Yale Romanization: syun-pùhn
- Jyutping: syun^{3}-pun^{4}
- IPA: [syn˧pʰun˧˥]
Southern Min
- Hokkien POJ: sǹg-pôaⁿ
- Tâi-lô: sǹg-puânn

The earliest known written documentation of the Chinese abacus dates to the 2nd century BC.

The Chinese abacus, also known as the suanpan (算盤/算盘, lit. "calculating tray"), comes in various lengths and widths, depending on the operator. It usually has more than seven rods. There are two beads on each rod in the upper deck and five beads each in the bottom one, to represent numbers in a bi-quinary coded decimal-like system. The beads are usually rounded and made of hardwood. The beads are counted by moving them up or down towards the beam; beads moved toward the beam are counted, while those moved away from it are not. One of the top beads is 5, while one of the bottom beads is 1. Each rod has a number under it, showing the place value. The suanpan can be reset to the starting position instantly by a quick movement along the horizontal axis to spin all the beads away from the horizontal beam at the center.

The prototype of the Chinese abacus appeared during the Han dynasty, and the beads are oval. The Song dynasty and earlier used the 1:4 type or four-beads abacus similar to the modern abacus including the shape of the beads commonly known as Japanese-style abacus.

In the early Ming dynasty, the abacus began to appear in a 1:5 ratio. The upper deck had one bead and the bottom had five beads. In the late Ming dynasty, the abacus styles appeared in a 2:5 ratio. The upper deck had two beads, and the bottom had five.

Various calculation techniques were devised for suanpan enabling efficient calculations. Some schools teach students how to use it.

In the long scroll Along the River During the Qingming Festival painted by Zhang Zeduan during the Song dynasty (960–1297), a suanpan is clearly visible beside an account book and doctor's prescriptions on the counter of an apothecary's (Feibao).

The similarity of the Roman abacus to the Chinese one suggests that one could have inspired the other, given evidence of a trade relationship between the Roman Empire and China. However, no direct connection has been demonstrated, and the similarity of the abacuses may be coincidental, both ultimately arising from counting with five fingers per hand. Where the Roman model (like most modern Korean and Japanese) has 4 plus 1 bead per decimal place, the standard suanpan has 5 plus 2. Incidentally, this ancient Chinese calculation system 市用制 (Shì yòng zhì) allows use with a hexadecimal numeral system (or any base up to 18) which is used for traditional Chinese measures of weight [(jīn (斤) and liǎng (兩)]. Instead of running on wires as in the Chinese, Korean, and Japanese models, the Roman model used grooves, presumably making arithmetic calculations much slower.

Another possible source of the suanpan is Chinese counting rods, which operated with a decimal system but lacked the concept of zero as a placeholder. The zero was probably introduced to the Chinese in the Tang dynasty (618–907) when travel in the Indian Ocean and the Middle East would have provided direct contact with India, allowing them to acquire the concept of zero and the decimal point from Indian merchants and mathematicians.

==== Japan ====
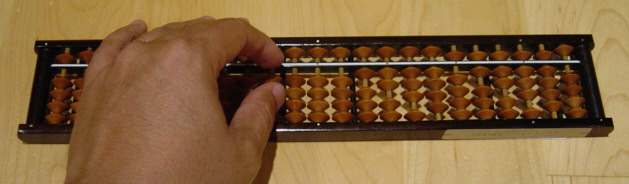
Japanese soroban

In Japan, the abacus is called soroban (算盤, そろばん, lit. "counting tray"). It was imported from China in the 14th century. It was probably in use by the working class a century or more before the ruling class adopted it, as rigid class structures slowed the spread of such innovations. The 1:4 abacus, which removes the seldom-used second and fifth bead, became popular in the 1940s.

Today's Japanese abacus is a 1:4 type, four-bead abacus, introduced from China in the Muromachi era. It adopts the form of the upper deck one bead and the bottom four beads. The top bead on the upper deck was equal to five and the bottom one is similar to the Chinese or Korean abacus, and the decimal number can be expressed, so the abacus is designed as a 1:4 device. The beads are always in the shape of a diamond. The quotient division is generally used instead of the division method; at the same time, in order to make the multiplication and division digits consistently use the division multiplication. Later, Japan had a 3:5 abacus called 天三算盤, which is now in the Ize Rongji collection of Shansi Village in Yamagata City. Japan also used a 2:5 type abacus.

The four-bead abacus spread, and became common around the world. Improvements to the Japanese abacus arose in various places. In China, an abacus with an aluminium frame and plastic beads has been used. The file is next to the four beads, and pressing the "clearing" button puts the upper bead in the upper position, and the lower bead in the lower position.

The abacus is still manufactured in Japan, despite the proliferation, practicality, and affordability of pocket electronic calculators. The use of the soroban is still taught in Japanese primary schools as part of mathematics, primarily as an aid to faster mental calculation. Using visual imagery, one can complete a calculation as quickly as with a physical instrument.

==== Korea ====
The Chinese abacus migrated from China to Korea around 1400 AD. Koreans call the abacus jupan (주판) or supan (수판), and the act of using a jupan is jusan (주산). The four-beads abacus (1:4) was introduced during the Goryeo Dynasty. The 5:1 abacus was introduced to Korea from China during the Ming Dynasty.

=== India ===
The Abhidharmakośabhāṣya of Vasubandhu (316–396), a Sanskrit work on Buddhist philosophy, says that the second-century CE philosopher Vasumitra said that "placing a wick (Sanskrit vartikā) on the number one (ekāṅka) means it is a one while placing the wick on the number hundred means it is called a hundred, and on the number one thousand means it is a thousand". It is unclear exactly what this arrangement may have been. Around the 5th century, Indian clerks were already finding new ways of recording the contents of the abacus. Hindu texts used the term śūnya (zero) to indicate the empty column on the abacus.

Since 2020, the organization Indian Abacus has run a national abacus competition in India. Several organizations operate in the abacus-based learning industry, including SIP Abacus, UCMAS, and PracticeAbacus, whose presence has expanded internationally. The industry has seen a rise in online instruction, particularly following the COVID-19 pandemic. India's information technology (IT) supported the development of digital resources for self-directed learning, facilitating international access to abacus education.

=== Americas ===
==== Mesoamerica ====
Some sources mention the use of an abacus called a nepohualtzintzin in ancient Aztec culture. This Mesoamerican abacus used a 5-digit base-20 system. The word Nepōhualtzintzin Nahuatl pronunciation: [nepoːwaɬˈt͡sint͡sin] comes from Nahuatl, formed by the roots; Ne – personal -; pōhual or pōhualli Nahuatl pronunciation: [ˈpoːwalːi] – the account -; and tzintzin Nahuatl pronunciation: [ˈt͡sint͡sin] – small similar elements. Its complete meaning was taken as: counting with small similar elements. Its use was taught in the Calmecac to the temalpouhqueh Nahuatl pronunciation: [temaɬˈpoʍkeʔ], who were students dedicated to taking the accounts of skies, from childhood.

The Nepōhualtzintzin was divided into two main parts separated by a bar or intermediate cord. In the left part were four beads. Beads in the first row have unitary values (1, 2, 3, and 4), and on the right side, three beads had values of 5, 10, and 15, respectively. In order to know the value of the respective beads of the upper rows, it is enough to multiply by 20 (by each row), the value of the corresponding count in the first row.

The device featured 13 rows with 7 beads, 91 in total. This was a basic number for this culture. It had a close relation to natural phenomena, the underworld, and the cycles of the heavens. One Nepōhualtzintzin (91) represented the number of days that a season of the year lasts, two Nepōhualtzitzin (182) is the number of days of the corn's cycle, from its sowing to its harvest, three Nepōhualtzintzin (273) is the number of days of a baby's gestation, and four Nepōhualtzintzin (364) completed a cycle and approximated one year. When translated into modern computer arithmetic, the Nepōhualtzintzin amounted to the rank from 10 to 18 in floating point, which precisely calculated large and small amounts, although round off was not allowed.

The rediscovery of the Nepōhualtzintzin was due to the Mexican engineer David Esparza Hidalgo, who in his travels throughout Mexico found diverse engravings and paintings of this instrument and reconstructed several of them in gold, jade, encrustations of shell, etc. Very old Nepōhualtzintzin are attributed to the Olmec culture, and some bracelets of Mayan origin, as well as a diversity of forms and materials in other cultures.

Sanchez wrote in Arithmetic in Maya that another base 5, base 4 abacus had been found in the Yucatán Peninsula that also computed calendar data. This was a finger abacus, on one hand, 0, 1, 2, 3, and 4 were used; and on the other hand 0, 1, 2, and 3 were used. Note the use of zero at the beginning and end of the two cycles.

==== Inca Empire ====
The quipu of the Incas was a system of colored knotted cords used to record numerical data, like advanced tally sticks – but not used to perform calculations. Calculations were carried out using a yupana (Quechua for "counting tool"; see figure) which was still in use after the conquest of Peru. The working principle of a yupana is unknown, but in 2001 Italian mathematician De Pasquale proposed an explanation. By comparing the form of several yupanas, researchers found that calculations were based using the Fibonacci sequence 1, 1, 2, 3, 5 and powers of 10, 20, and 40 as place values for the different fields in the instrument. Using the Fibonacci sequence would keep the number of grains within any one field at a minimum.

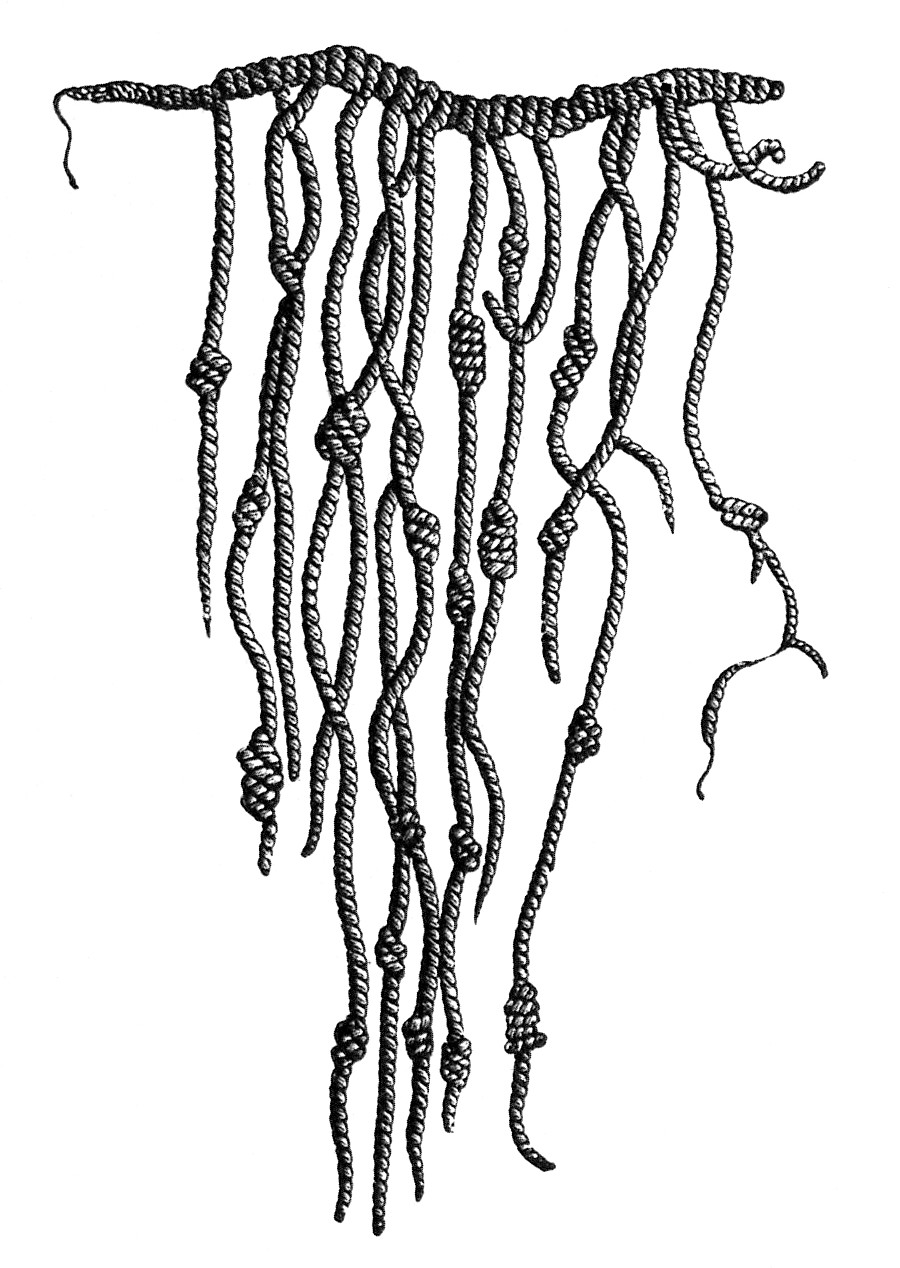
Representation of an Inca quipu

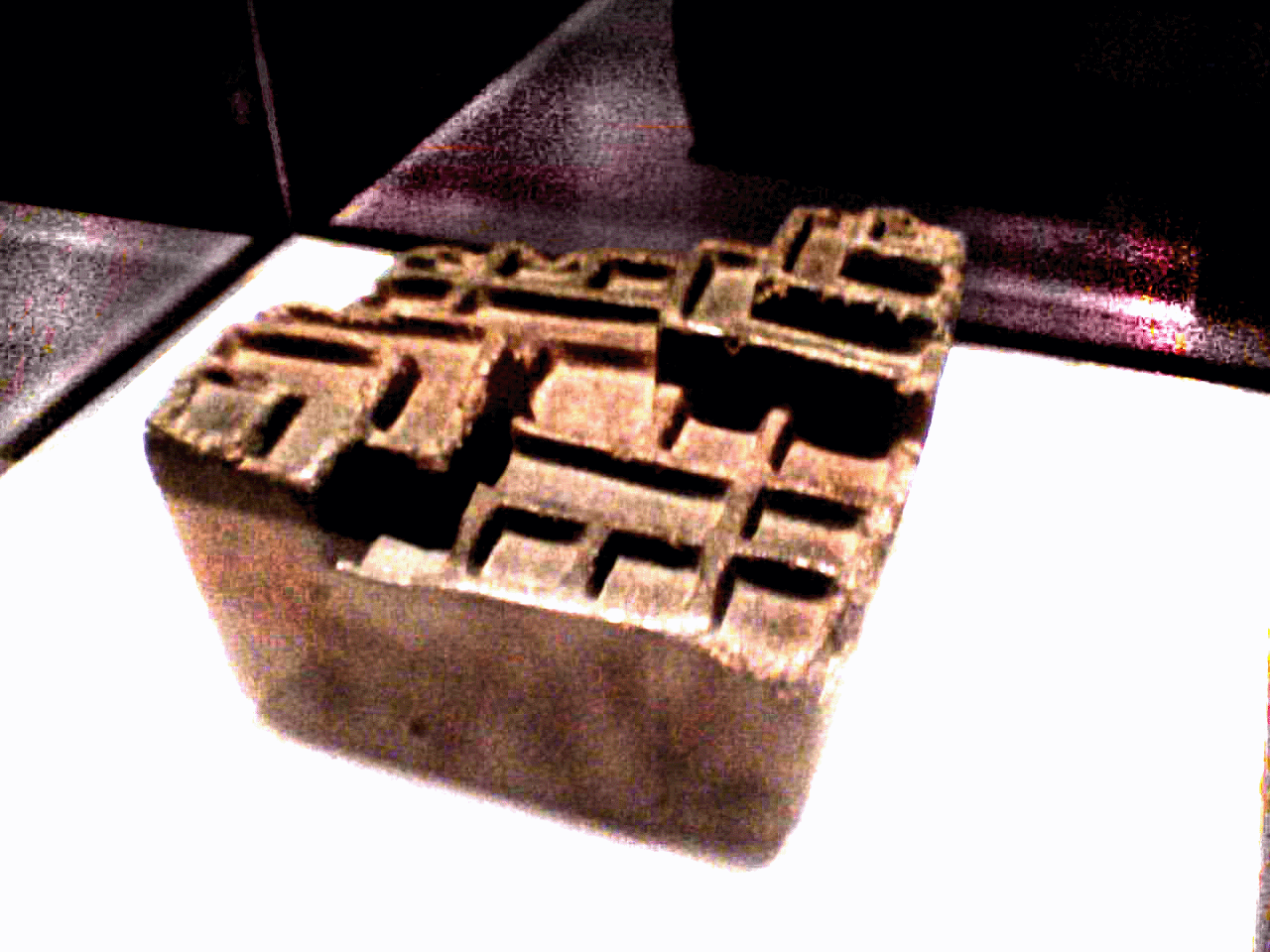
A yupana as used by the Incas

== Types ==
=== School abacus ===
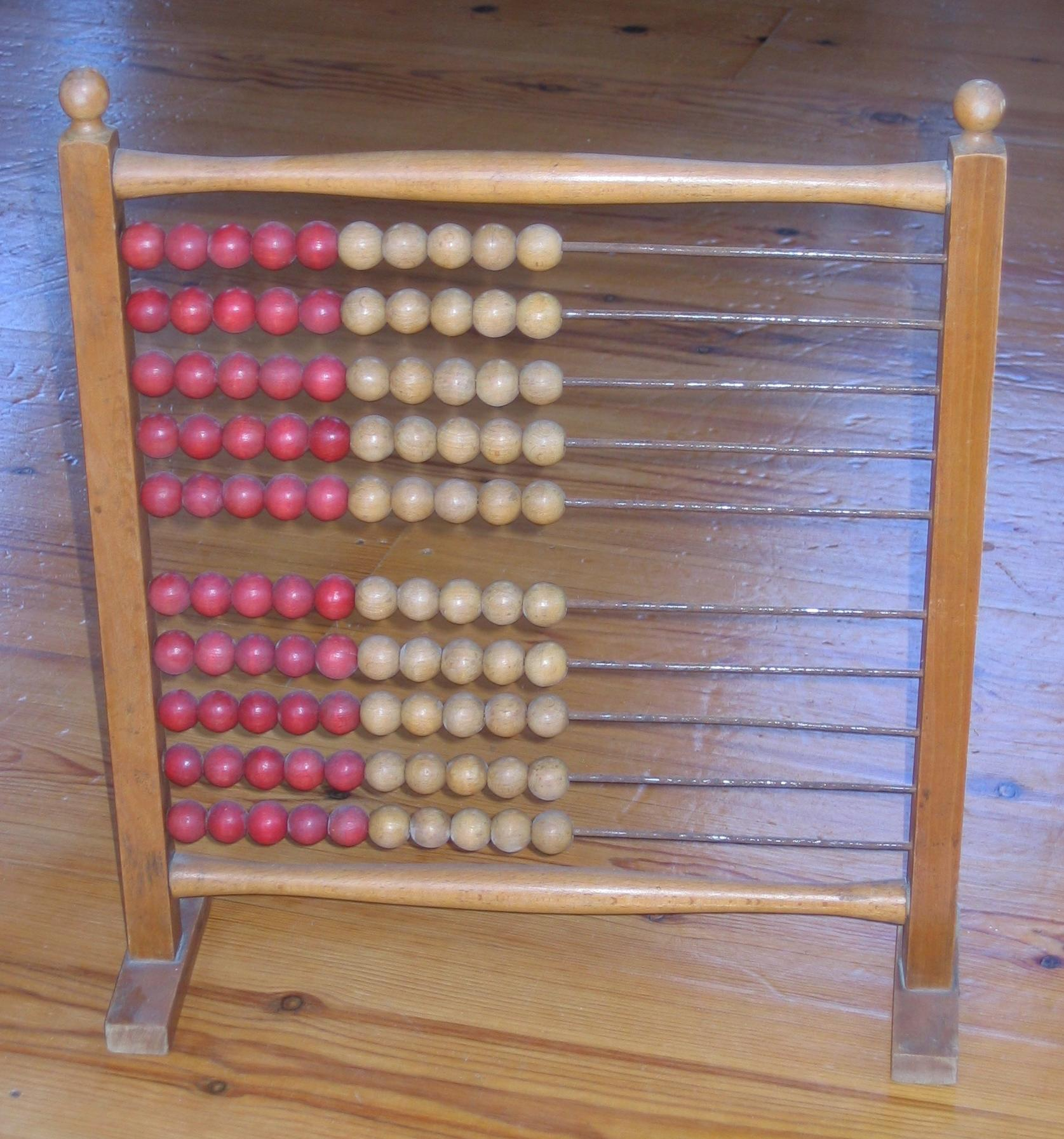
Early 20th century abacus used in Danish elementary school

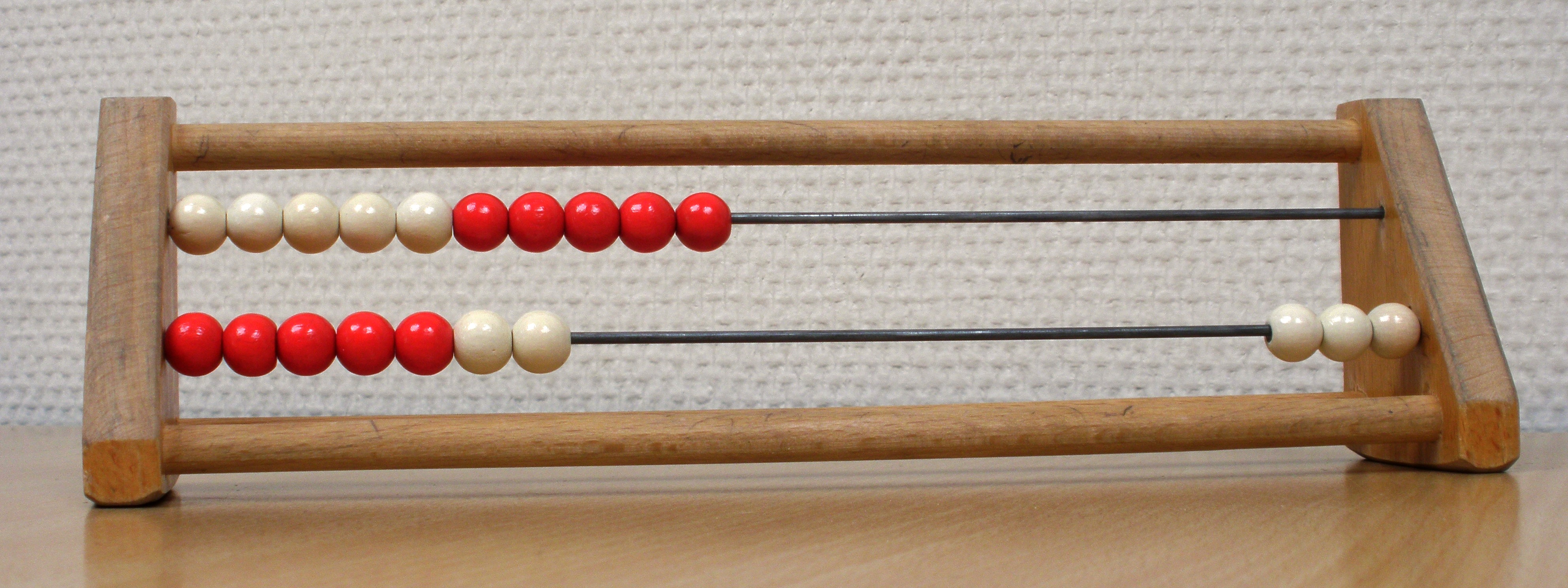
A twenty bead Rekenrek

Around the world, abacuses have been used in pre-schools and elementary schools as an aid in teaching the numeral system and arithmetic.

In Western countries, a bead frame similar to the Russian abacus but with straight wires and a vertical frame is common (see image).

Unlike other abaci, each bead represents one unit irrespective of which wire it is on. E.g., 42 can be represented by shifting all 10 beads on four wires and two beads on a fifth wire. Thus, in the bead frame shown, numbers up to 100 may be represented. Teaching multiplication, e.g. 6 times 7, may be represented by shifting 7 beads on 6 wires, subsequently rearranged to show 42 as described before.

The red-and-white abacus is used in contemporary primary schools for a wide range of number-related lessons. The twenty bead version, referred to by its Dutch name rekenrek ("calculating frame"), is often used, either on a string of beads or on a rigid framework.

=== Binary abacus ===
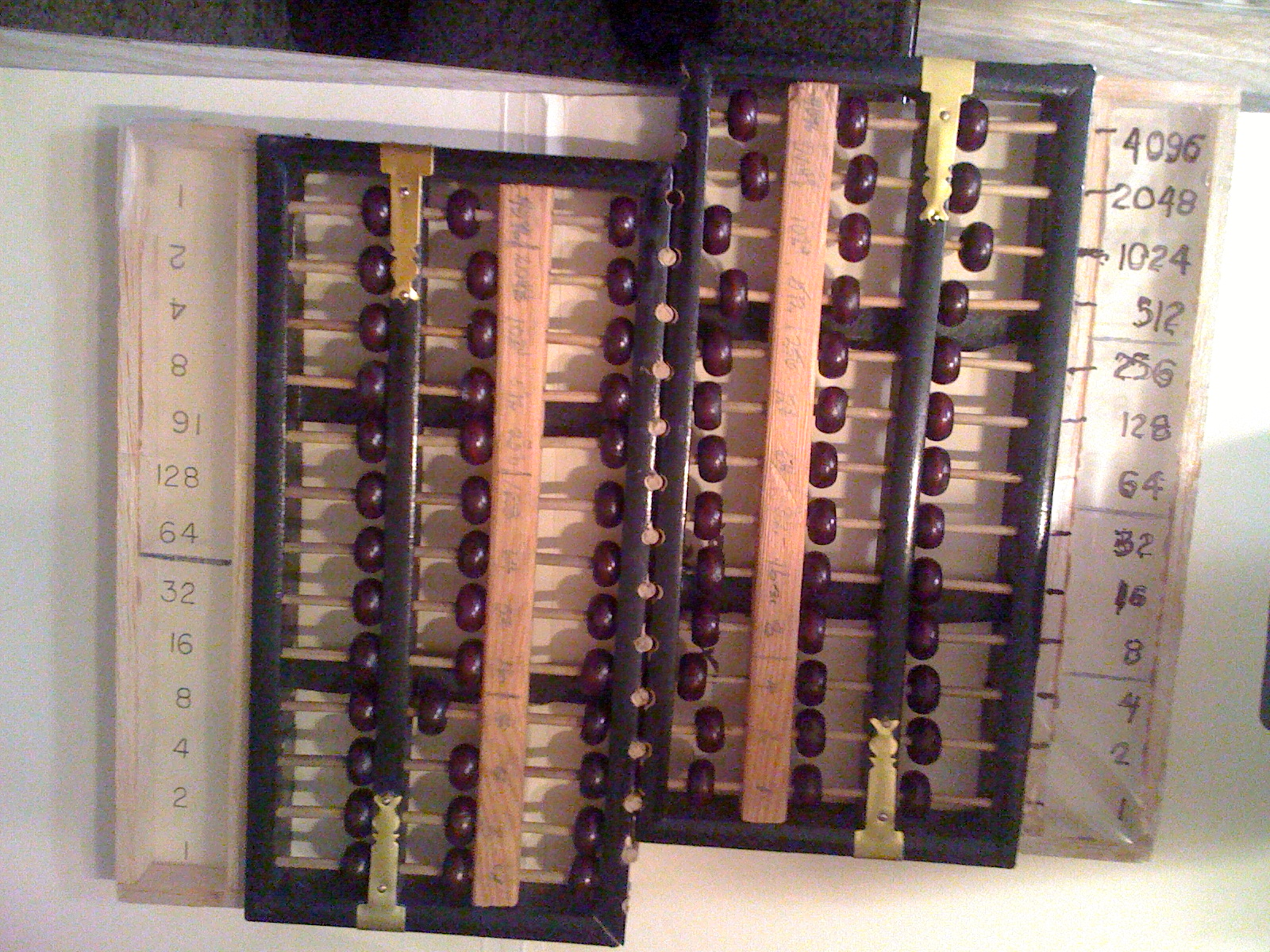
Two binary abacuses constructed by Robert C. Good Jr., made from two Chinese abacuses

The binary abacus is used to explain how computers manipulate numbers. The abacus shows how numbers, letters, and signs can be stored in a binary system on a computer, or via ASCII. The device consists of beads on parallel wires arranged in three rows; each bead represents a switch which can be either "on" or "off".

=== Nano-abacus ===
Atomic-scale abacuses can be constructed using nanotechnology. The first such nano-abacus was developed by IBM in 1997.

== Neurological analysis ==
Learning how to calculate with the abacus may improve capacity for mental calculation. Abacus-based mental calculation (AMC), which was derived from the abacus, is the act of performing calculations, including addition, subtraction, multiplication, and division, in the mind by manipulating an imagined abacus. It is a high-level cognitive skill that runs calculations with an effective algorithm. People doing long-term AMC training show higher numerical memory capacity and experience more effectively connected neural pathways. They are able to retrieve memory to deal with complex processes. AMC involves both visuospatial and visuomotor processing that generate the visual abacus and move the imaginary beads. Since it only requires that the final position of beads be remembered, it takes less memory and less computation time.

== Visually impaired users ==
An adapted abacus, invented by Tim Cranmer, and called a Cranmer abacus is commonly used by visually impaired users. A piece of soft fabric or rubber is placed behind the beads, keeping them in place while the users manipulate them. The device is then used to perform the mathematical functions of multiplication, division, addition, subtraction, square root, and cube root.

Although visually impaired students have benefited from talking calculators, the abacus is often taught to these students in early grades. Such students can also complete mathematical assignments using a braille-writer and Nemeth code (a type of braille code for mathematics) but large multiplication and long division problems are tedious. The abacus is a useful alternative to conventional pen and paper methods, enabling the visually impaired to solve mathematical problems.

== See also ==
- Chinese Zhusuan
- Chisanbop
- Logical abacus
- Napier's bones
- Sand table
- Slide rule
- Soroban
