= Chisanbop =

Finger counting method

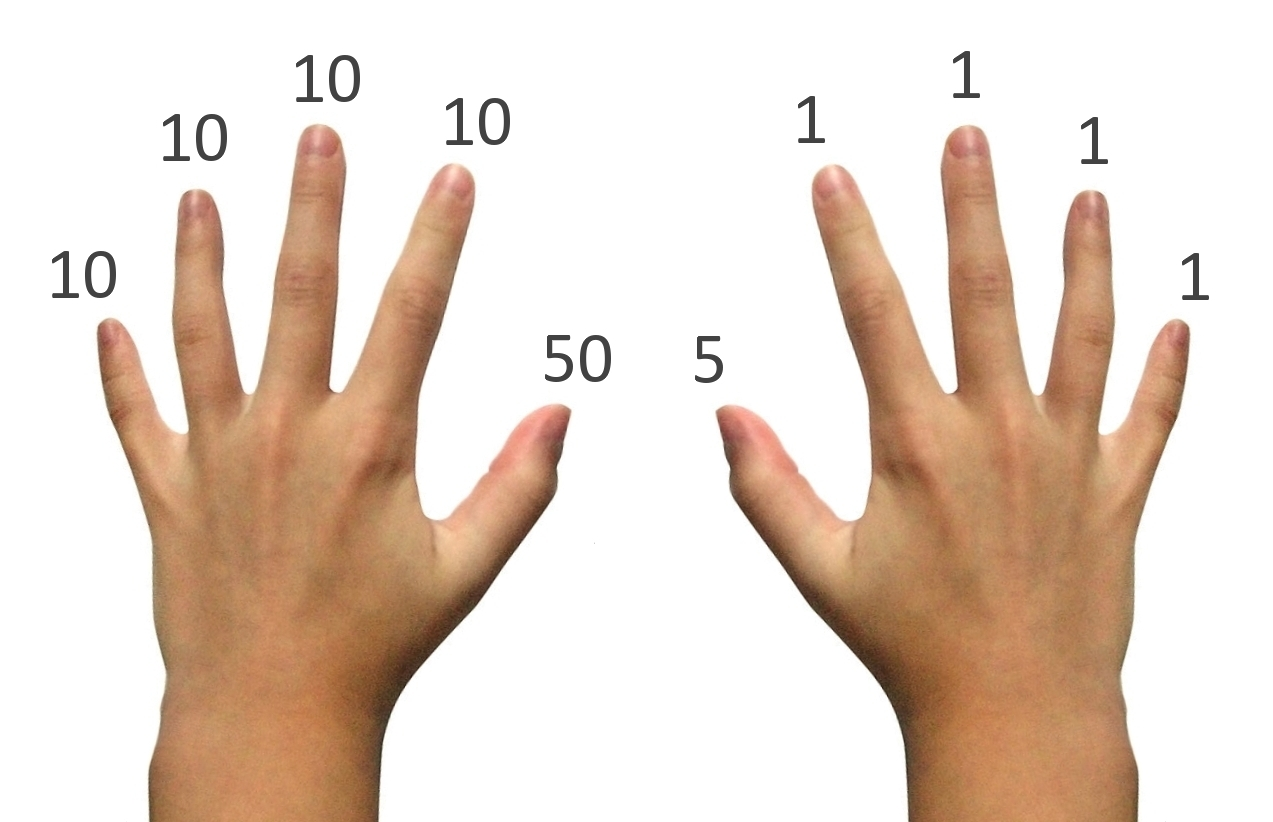
The Chisanbop system. When a finger is touching the table, it contributes its corresponding number to a total.

Chisanbop or chisenbop (from Korean chi (ji) finger + sanpŏp (sanbeop) calculation 지산법/指算法), sometimes called Fingermath, is a finger counting method used to perform basic mathematical operations. According to The Complete Book of Chisanbop by Hang Young Pai, chisanbop was created in the 1940s in Korea by Sung Jin Pai and revised by his son Hang Young Pai, who brought the system to the United States in 1977.

With the chisanbop method, it is possible to represent all numbers from 0 to 99 with the hands, rather than the usual 0 to 10, and to add, subtract, multiply and divide numbers. The system has been described as being easier to use than a physical abacus for students with visual impairments.

== Basic concepts ==
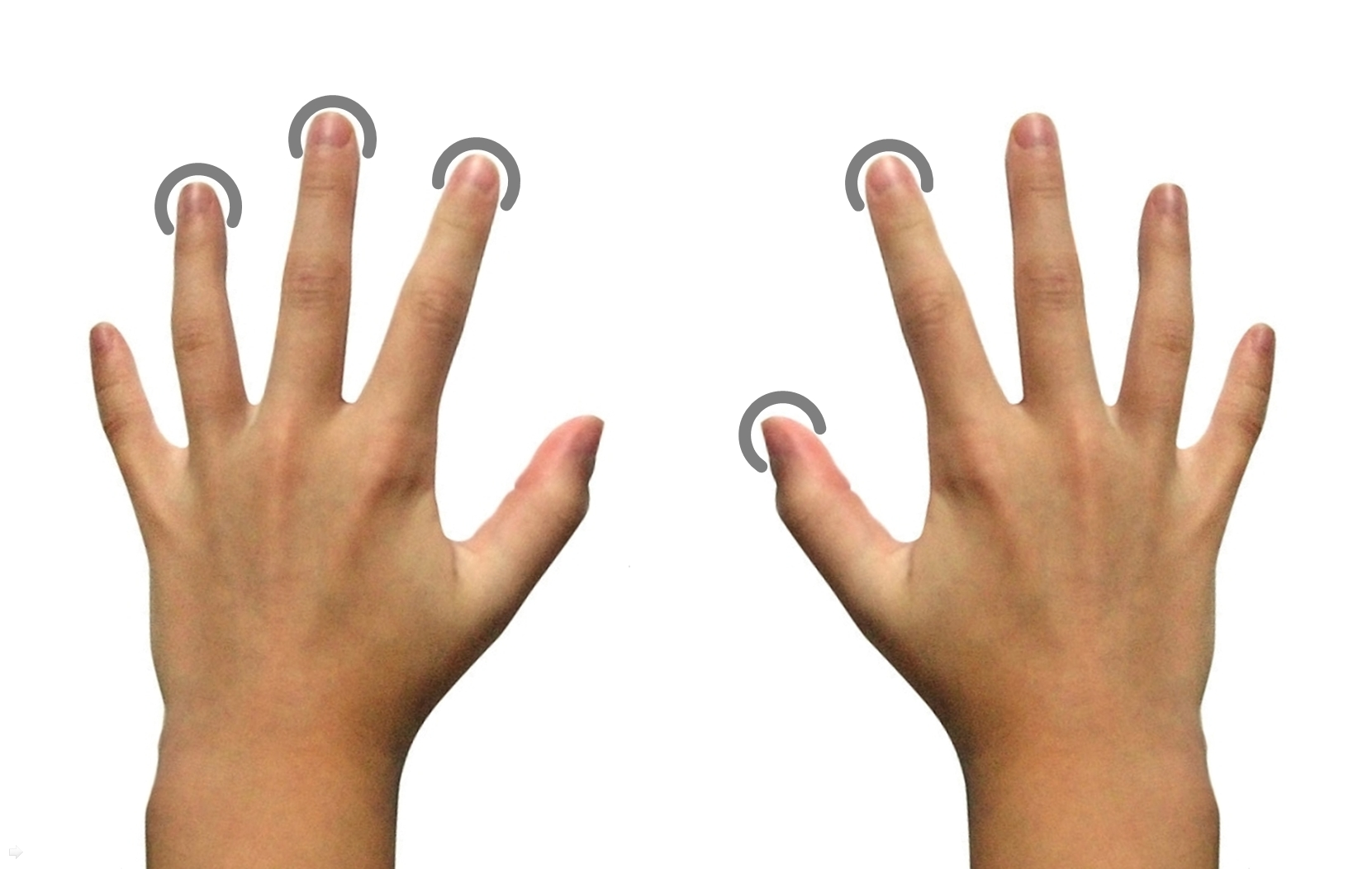
36 represented in chisanbop, where four fingers and a thumb are touching the table and the rest of the digits are raised. The three fingers on the left hand represent 10+10+10 = 30; the thumb and one finger on the right hand represent 5+1=6.

Counting from 1 to 20 in Chisanbop

Each finger has a value of one, while the thumb has a value of five. Therefore, each hand can represent the digits 0–9, rather than the usual 0–5.

The two hands combine to represent two digits; the right hand is the ones place, and the left hand is the tens place. This way, any number from 0 to 99 can be shown, and it's possible to count up to 99 instead of just 10.

The hands can be held above a table, with the fingers pressing down on the table; or the hands can simply be held up, fingers extended, as with the more common practice of 0-10 counting.

== Adoption in the United States ==
Chisanbop can be used for teaching math, or simply for counting. The results for teaching math have been mixed. A school in Shawnee Mission, Kansas, ran a pilot program with students in 1979. It was found that although they could add large numbers quickly, they could not add them in their heads. The program was dropped. Grace Burton of the University of North Carolina said, "It doesn't teach the basic number facts, only to count faster. Adding and subtracting quickly are only a small part of mathematics."

== See also ==
- Bi-quinary coded decimal
- Finger binary
