= Unary system =

Unary system may refer to:

- Unary numeral system
- Unary operation
