= Counting Rod Numerals =

- Range: U+1D360..U+1D37F (32 code points)
- Plane: SMP
- Scripts: Common
- Symbol sets: Counting rod numbers; East Asian tally marks; European tally marks
- Assigned: 25 code points
- Unused: 7 reserved code points

Unicode Version History
- 5.0 (2006): 18 (+18)
- 11.0 (2018): 25 (+7)

Unicode documentation
- Code chart ∣ Web page

Counting Rod Numerals is a Unicode block containing traditional Chinese counting rod symbols, which mathematicians used for calculation in ancient China, Japan, Korea, and Vietnam. The orientation of the Unicode characters follows Song dynasty convention, with digits represented as horizontal lines, and tens represented as vertical lines, which differs from Han dynasty practice which represented digits as vertical lines, and tens as horizontal lines.

The block also contains five ideographic tally marks, based on the five strokes of the character 正, which are widely used in East Asia. There are also two characters for use in representing traditional European tally marks (only Tally Mark One and Tally Mark Five are encoded, with tally numbers two through four intended to be represented as a sequence of two through four Tally Mark One characters).

== Block ==
Counting Rod Numerals^{[1]}^{[2]} Official Unicode Consortium code chart (PDF)
| | 0 | 1 | 2 | 3 | 4 | 5 | 6 | 7 | 8 | 9 | A | B | C | D | E | F |
| U+1D36x | 𝍠 | 𝍡 | 𝍢 | 𝍣 | 𝍤 | 𝍥 | 𝍦 | 𝍧 | 𝍨 | 𝍩 | 𝍪 | 𝍫 | 𝍬 | 𝍭 | 𝍮 | 𝍯 |
| U+1D37x | 𝍰 | 𝍱 | 𝍲 | 𝍳 | 𝍴 | 𝍵 | 𝍶 | 𝍷 | 𝍸 | | | | | | | |
Notes 1.As of Unicode version 17.0 2.Grey areas indicate non-assigned code points

== History ==
The following Unicode-related documents record the purpose and process of defining specific characters in the Counting Rod Numerals block:

| Version | Final code points (Note: Proposed code points and characters names may differ from final code points and names) | Count | L2 ID | WG2 ID | Document |
|---|---|---|---|---|---|
| 5.0 | U+1D360..1D371 | 18 | L2/04-227 | N2816 | Cullen, Christopher; Jenkins, John (2004-06-18), Proposal to add Chinese counting rod numerals to Unicode and ISO/IEC 10646 |
| 5.0 | U+1D360..1D371 | 18 | L2/04-156R2 | | Moore, Lisa (2004-08-13), "Chinese counting rod numerals (C.17.7)", UTC #99 Minutes |
| 11.0 | U+1D372..1D376 | 5 | L2/15-328 | | Lunde, Ken; Miura, Daisuke (2015-11-30), Proposal to encode tally marks |
| 11.0 | U+1D372..1D376 | 5 | L2/16-037 | | Anderson, Deborah; Whistler, Ken; McGowan, Rick; Pournader, Roozbeh; Glass, Andrew; Iancu, Laurențiu (2016-01-22), "17. Tally marks", Recommendations to UTC #146 January 2016 on Script Proposals |
| 11.0 | U+1D372..1D376 | 5 | L2/16-046 | | Lunde, Ken; Miura, Daisuke (2016-01-27), Proposal to encode five ideographic tally marks |
| 11.0 | U+1D372..1D376 | 5 | L2/16-004 | | Moore, Lisa (2016-02-01), "E.2", UTC #146 Minutes |
| 11.0 | U+1D377..1D378 | 2 | L2/15-328 | | Lunde, Ken; Miura, Daisuke (2015-11-30), Proposal to encode tally marks |
| 11.0 | U+1D377..1D378 | 2 | L2/16-037 | | Anderson, Deborah; Whistler, Ken; McGowan, Rick; Pournader, Roozbeh; Glass, Andrew; Iancu, Laurențiu (2016-01-22), "17. Tally marks", Recommendations to UTC #146 January 2016 on Script Proposals |
| 11.0 | U+1D377..1D378 | 2 | L2/16-065 | | Lunde, Ken; Miura, Daisuke (2016-03-14), Proposal to encode two Western-style tally marks |
| 11.0 | U+1D377..1D378 | 2 | L2/16-156 | | Anderson, Deborah; Whistler, Ken; Pournader, Roozbeh; Glass, Andrew; Iancu, Laurențiu (2016-05-06), "15. Tally Marks", Recommendations to UTC #147 May 2016 on Script Proposals |
| 11.0 | U+1D377..1D378 | 2 | L2/16-121 | | Moore, Lisa (2016-05-20), "E.7", UTC #147 Minutes |
| 11.0 | U+1D377..1D378 | 2 | L2/17-362 | | Moore, Lisa (2018-02-02), "C.2.1", UTC #153 Minutes |

== See also ==
- Numerals in Unicode
