= Tally stick =

Memory aid device

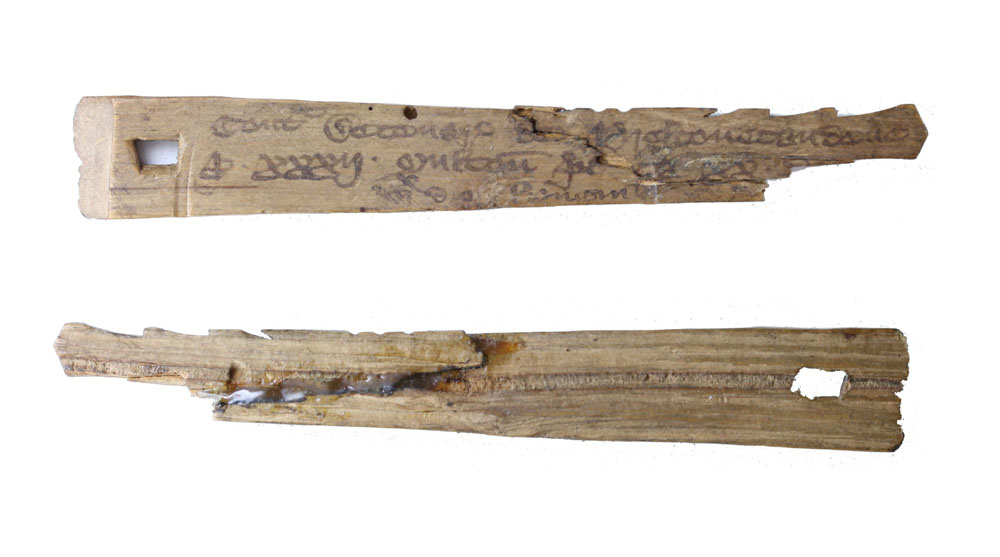
Medieval English split tally stick (front and reverse view). The stick is notched and inscribed to record a debt owed to the rural dean of Preston Candover, Hampshire, of a tithe of 20d each on 32 sheep, amounting to a total sum of £2 13s. 4d.

A tally stick (or simply a tally) was an ancient memory aid used to record and document numbers, quantities, and messages. Tally sticks first appear as animal bones carved with notches during the Upper Palaeolithic; a notable example is the Ishango Bone. Historical reference is made by Pliny the Elder (AD 23–79) about the best wood to use for tallies, and by Marco Polo (1254–1324) who mentions the use of the tally in China. Tallies have been used for numerous purposes such as messaging and scheduling, and especially in financial and legal transactions, to the point of being currency.

== Kinds of tallies ==
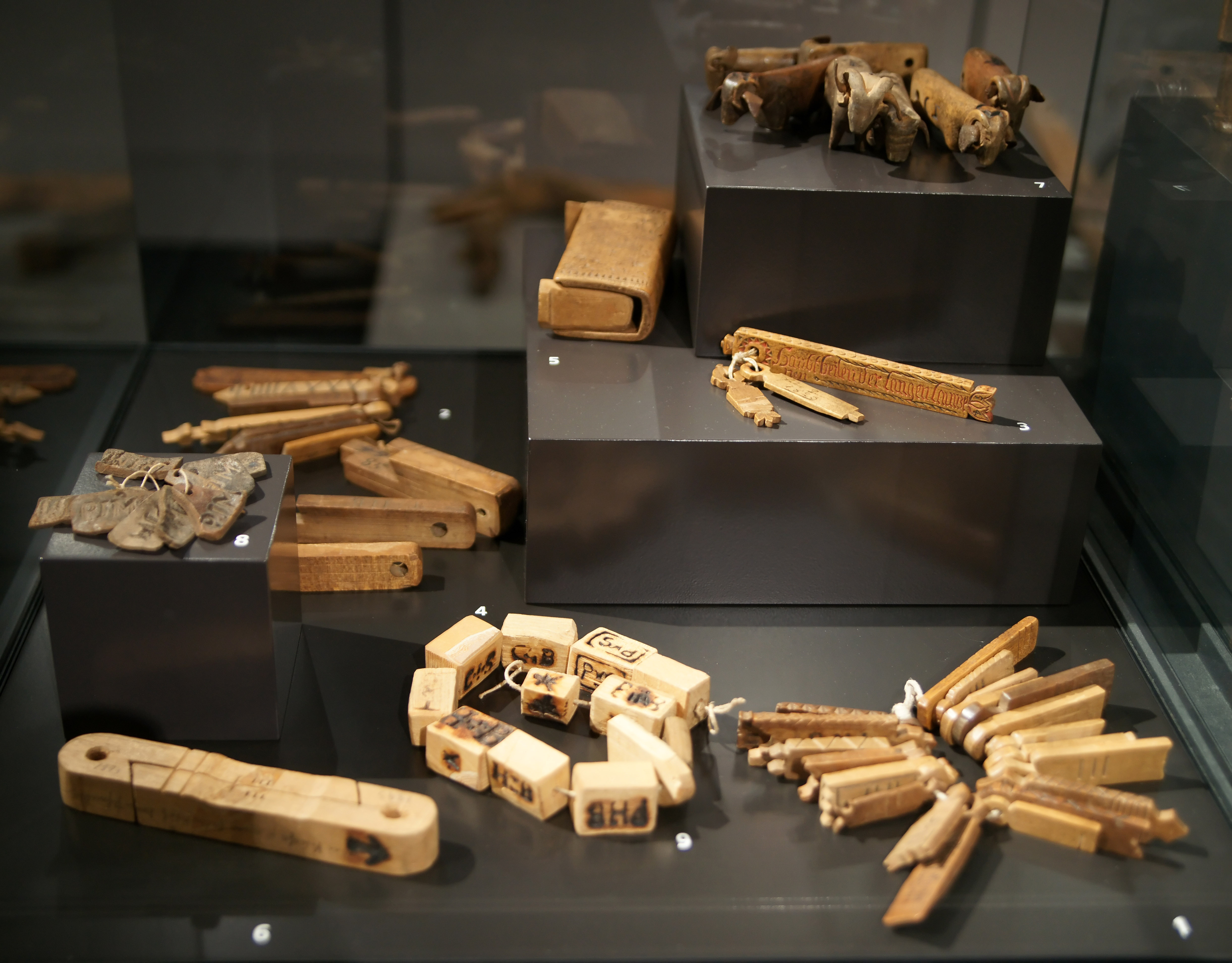
Single and split tallies from the Swiss Alps, 18th to early 20th century (Swiss Alpine Museum)

There are two principal forms of tally sticks: the single tally and the split tally. A comparable example of this primitive counting device can be found in various types of prayer beads.

=== Possible palaeolithic tally sticks ===
A number of anthropological artefacts have been conjectured to be tally sticks:

- The Lebombo bone, dated between 44,200 and 43,000 years old, is a baboon's fibula with 29 distinct notches, discovered within the Border Cave in the Lebombo Mountains of Eswatini.
- The so-called Wolf bone (cs) is a prehistoric artefact discovered in 1937 in Czechoslovakia during excavations at Dolní Věstonice, Moravia, led by Karl Absolon. Dated to the Aurignacian, approximately 30,000 years ago, the bone is marked with 55 marks which some believe to be tally marks. The head of an ivory Venus figurine was excavated close to the bone.
- The Ishango bone is a bone tool, dated to the Upper Palaeolithic era, around 18,000 to 20,000 BC. It is a dark brown length of bone. It has a series of possible tally marks carved in three columns running the length of the tool. It was found in 1950 in Ishango (east Belgian Congo).

=== Single tally ===
The single tally stick was an elongated piece of bone, ivory, wood, or stone which is marked with a system of notches (see: tally marks). The single tally stick serves predominantly mnemonic purposes. Related to the single tally concept are messenger sticks (used by, e.g., Inuit tribes), the knotted cords, khipus or quipus, as used by the Inca. Greek historian Herodotus (c. 484 – c. 425 BC) reported the use of a knotted cord by Darius I of Persia (r. 522 – 486 BC).

=== Split tally ===
The split tally became a prevalent technique in medieval Europe, a time characterised by a scarcity of coinage, to document bilateral exchanges and debts. Typically fashioned from squared hazelwood, the stick was inscribed with a series of notches before being split lengthwise. Each party in the transaction retained one half of the marked stick, both pieces bearing identical records. Over the years, this method was refined to the point of becoming virtually impervious to tampering. One such refinement was to make the two halves of the stick of different lengths. The longer part was called stock and was given to the stock holder, which had advanced money (or other items) to the receiver. The shorter portion of the stick was called foil and was given to the party which had received the funds or goods. Using this technique each of the parties had an identifiable record of the transaction. The natural irregularities in the surfaces of the tallies where they were split would mean that only the original two halves would fit back together perfectly, and so would verify that they were matching halves of the same transaction. If one party tried to unilaterally change the value of his half of the tally stick by adding more notches, the absence of those notches would be apparent on the other party's tally stick. The split tally was accepted as legal proof in medieval courts and the Napoleonic Code (1804) still makes reference to the tally stick in Article 1333. Along the Danube and in Switzerland the tally was still used in the 20th century in rural economies.

The most prominent and best recorded use of the split tally stick or "nick-stick" being used as a form of currency was when Henry I introduced the tally stick system in medieval England in around 1100. The tally sticks recorded a payment of taxes, but soon began to circulate in a secondary discount market, being accepted as payment for goods and services at a discount since they could be later presented to the treasury as proof of taxes paid. Then tally sticks began to be issued in advance, in order to finance war and other royal spending, and circulated as "wooden money".

The system of tally marks of the Exchequer is described in The Dialogue Concerning the Exchequer as follows:

The manner of cutting is as follows. At the top of the tally a cut is made, the thickness of the palm of the hand, to represent a thousand pounds; then a hundred pounds by a cut the breadth of a thumb; twenty pounds, the breadth of the little finger; a single pound, the width of a swollen barleycorn; a shilling rather narrower; then a penny is marked by a single cut without removing any wood.

The cuts were made the full width of the stick so that, after splitting, the portion kept by the issuer (the stock) exactly matched the piece (the foil) given as a receipt. Each stick had to have the details of the transaction written on it, in ink, to make it a valid record.

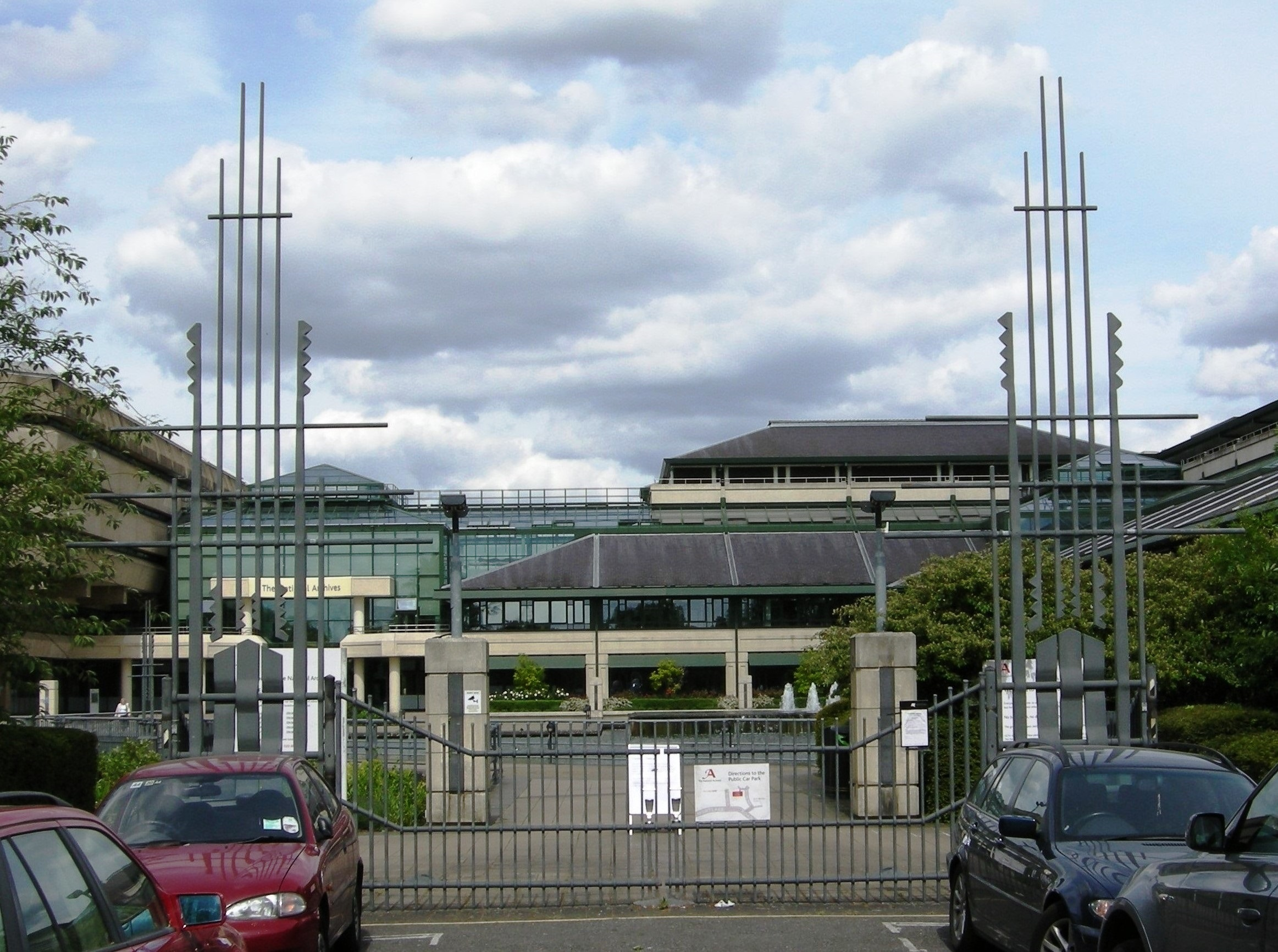
Entrance gates to the UK National Archives, Kew, from Ruskin Avenue. The notched vertical elements were inspired by medieval tally sticks.

Royal tallies (debt of the Crown) also played a role in the formation of the Bank of England at the end of the 17th century. In 1697, the bank issued £1 million worth of stock in exchange for £800,000 worth of tallies at par and £200,000 in bank notes. This new stock was said to be "engrafted". The government promised not only to pay the Bank interest on the tallies subscribed but to redeem them over a period of years. The "engrafted" stock was then cancelled simultaneously with the redemption.

The split tally of the Exchequer remained in continuous use in England until 1826, when the conditions required for activation of the Receipt of the Exchequer Act 1783 (23 Geo. 3. c. 82), the death of the last Exchequer Chamberlain, came about. In 1834, following the passing of 4 Will. 4. c .15, tally sticks representing six centuries' worth of financial records were ordered to be burned in two furnaces in the Houses of Parliament. The resulting fire set the chimney ablaze and then spread until most of the building was destroyed. This event was described by Charles Dickens in an 1855 article on administrative reform.

Tally sticks feature in the design of the entrance gates to The National Archives at Kew.

== See also ==
- Bamboo and wooden slips
- Bamboo tally
- Chirograph: a similar system for creating two or more matching copies of a legal document on parchment
- Fu (tally)
- Measuring rod
- Prehistoric numerals
