= Ishango bone =

Paleolithic artifact from Congo

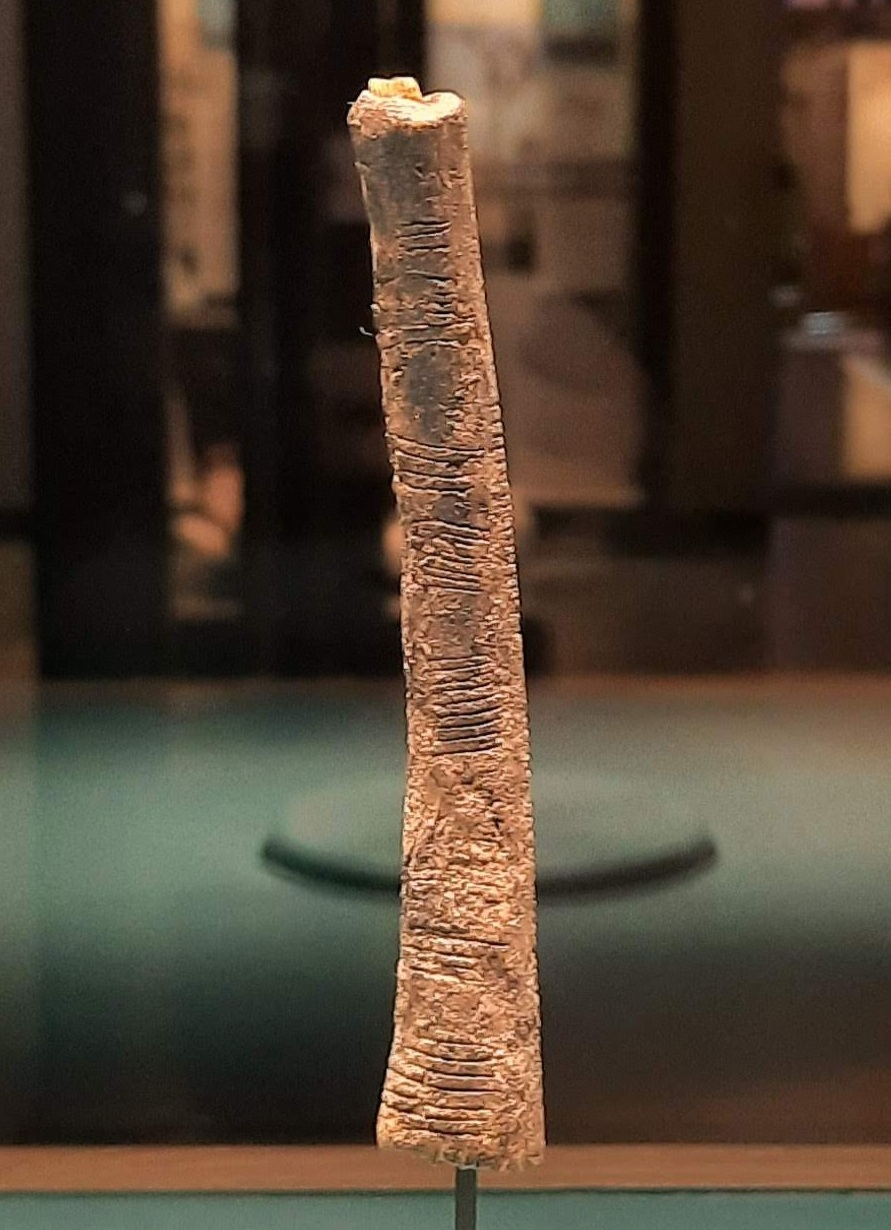
The Ishango bone on exhibition at the Royal Belgian Institute of Natural Sciences

The Ishango bone, discovered at the "Fisherman Settlement" of Ishango in the Democratic Republic of the Congo, is a bone tool and possible mathematical device that dates to the Upper Paleolithic era. The curved bone is dark brown in color, about 10 centimeters in length, and features a sharp piece of quartz affixed to one end, perhaps for engraving. Because the bone has been narrowed, scraped, polished, and engraved to a certain extent, it is no longer possible to determine what animal the bone belonged to, although it is assumed to have been a mammal.

The ordered engravings have led many to speculate about the meaning behind these marks, including interpretations involving mathematical significance or astrological relevance. It is thought by some to be a tally stick, as it features a series of marks that have been interpreted as tally marks carved in three columns running the length of the tool, although it has also been suggested that the scratches might have been to create a better grip on the handle or for some other non-mathematical reason. Others argue that the marks on the object are non-random and that it was likely a kind of counting tool and used to perform simple mathematical procedures.

Other speculations include the engravings on the bone serving as a lunar calendar. Dating to 20,000 years before present, it has been described as "the oldest mathematical tool of humankind", although older engraved bones are also known, such as the approximately 26,000-year-old "Wolf Bone" from Dolni Vestonice in the Czech Republic, and the approximately 42,000-year-old Lebombo bone from southern Africa.

== History ==
=== Archaeological discovery ===
The Ishango bone was found in 1950 by Belgian Jean de Heinzelin de Braucourt while exploring what was then the Belgian Congo. It was discovered in the area of Ishango near the Semliki River. Lake Edward empties into the Semliki, which forms part of the headwaters of the Nile River (now on the border between modern-day Uganda and D.R. Congo). The Late Stone Age human remains from Ishango belong to Homo sapiens, although they exhibit some archaic morphological characteristics. The most recent inhabitants, who gave the area its name, have no immediate connections with the primary settlement, which was "buried in a volcanic eruption".

On an excavation, de Heinzelin discovered a bone about the "size of a pencil" amongst human remains and many stone tools in a small community that fished and gathered in this area of Africa. Professor de Heinzelin brought the Ishango bone to Belgium, where it was stored in the treasure room of the Royal Belgian Institute of Natural Sciences in Brussels. Several molds and copies were created from the petrified bone in order to preserve the delicate nature of the fragile artifact while being exported. A written request to the museum was required to see the artifact, as it was no longer on public display.

=== Dating ===
The artifact was first estimated to have originated between 9,000 BCE and 6,500 BCE, making it between 8,500 and 11,000 years old, but numerous other analyses suggested the bone could be as old as 44,000 years. The dating of the site where it was discovered was re-evaluated, however, and it is now believed to be about 20,000 years old (dating from between 18,000 BCE and 20,000 BCE). The dating of this bone is widely debated in the archaeological community, as the ratio of carbon isotopes was upset by nearby volcanic activity.

== Interpretations ==
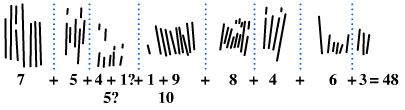
First (sometimes called "center") column (shown in picture at the article introduction), from bottom to top.

Second (or "right") column, from bottom to top.

Third (or "left") column, from bottom to top.

=== Mathematical ===
The 168 etchings on the bone are ordered in three parallel columns along the length of the bone, with each mark having a varying orientation and length. The first column, or central column along the most curved side of the bone, is referred to as the M column, from the French word milieu (middle). The left and right columns are respectively referred to as G and D, or gauche (left) and droite (right) in French.

The parallel markings have led to various hypotheses, such as that the implement indicates an understanding of decimals or prime numbers. Though these propositions have been questioned, it is considered likely by many scholars that the tool was used for mathematical purposes, perhaps including simple mathematical procedures or to construct a numeral system.

The discoverer of the Ishango bone, de Heinzelin, suggested that the bone was evidence of knowledge of simple arithmetic, or at least that the markings were "deliberately planned". He based his interpretation on archaeological evidence, comparing "Ishango harpoon heads to those found in northern Sudan and ancient Egypt". This comparison led to the suggestion of a link between arithmetic processes conducted at Ishango with the "commencement of mathematics in ancient Egypt." The third column has been interpreted as a "table of prime numbers", as column G appears to illustrate prime numbers between 10 and 20, but this might be a coincidence. Historian of mathematics Peter S. Rudman argues that prime numbers were probably not understood until the early Greek period of about 500 BCE, and were dependent on the concept of division, which he dates to no earlier than 10,000 BCE.

More recently, mathematicians Dirk Huylebrouck and Vladimir Pletser have proposed that the Ishango bone is a counting tool using the base 12 and sub-bases 3 and 4, and involving simple multiplication, somewhat comparable to a primitive slide rule. They have concluded, however, that the evidence is insufficient to confirm an understanding of prime numbers during this time period.

Anthropologist Caleb Everett has also provided insight into interpretations of the bone, explaining that "the quantities evident in the groupings of marks are not random", and are likely evidence of prehistoric numerals. Everett suggests that the first column may reflect some "doubling pattern" and that the tool might have been used for counting and multiplication and also possibly as a "numeric reference table".

George Gheverghese Joseph wrote: "A single bone with suggestive markings raises interesting possibilities of a highly developed sense of arithmetical awareness; it does not provide conclusive evidence." He suggested that it might 'represent an early calendar of events of a ceremonial or ritual nature superimposed on a record of a lunar/menstrual cycle constructed by a woman' or be a precursor of writing.

Caution in interpretation is warranted by the existence of a second bone found in the same archaeological layer, one whose marks are not mathematically suggestive.

=== Astronomical ===
Alexander Marshack, an archaeologist from Harvard University, speculated that the Ishango bone represents numeric notation of a six-month lunar calendar after conducting a "detailed microscopic examination" of the bone. This idea arose from the fact that the markings on the first two columns add up to 60, corresponding with two lunar months, and the sum of the number of carvings on the last row being 48, or a month and a half. Marshack generated a diagram comparing the different sizes and phases of the Moon with the notches of the Ishango bone. There is some circumstantial evidence to support this alternate hypothesis, being that present day African societies utilize bones, strings, and other devices as calendars. Critics in the field of archaeology have concluded, however, that Marshack's interpretation is flawed and describe that his analysis of the Ishango bone confines itself to a simple search for a pattern, rather than an actual test of his hypothesis.

This has also led Claudia Zaslavsky to suggest that the creator of the tool could have been a woman, tracking the lunar phase in relation to the menstrual cycle.

=== Other explanations ===
Mathematician Olivier Keller warns against the urge to project modern culture's perception of numbers onto the Ishango bone. Keller explains that this practice encourages observers to negate and possibly ignore alternative symbolic materials, those which are present in a range of media (on human remains, stones and cave art) from the Upper Paleolithic era and beyond which also deserve equitable investigation.

Dirk Huylebrouck, in a review of the research on the object, favors the idea that the Ishango bone had some advanced mathematical use: "Whatever the interpretation, the patterns surely show the bone was more than a simple tally stick." He also remarks that "to credit the computational and astronomical reading simultaneously would be far-fetched", quoting mathematician George Joseph, who stated: "A single bone may well collapse under the heavy weight of conjectures piled onto it."

Similarly, George Joseph, in "The Crest of the Peacock: Non-European Roots of Mathematics" also asserted that the Ishango bone was "more than a simple tally". Moreover, he states: "Certain underlying numerical patterns may be observed within each of the rows marked." Even so, regarding various speculative theories of its exact mathematical use, Joseph concluded that several are plausible but uncertain.

== See also ==
- Lebombo bone
- History of mathematics
- Paleolithic tally sticks

== Bibliography ==
- O. Keller, "The fables of Ishango, or the irresistible temptation of mathematical fiction"
- V. Pletser, D. Huylebrouck, "Contradictions and narrowness of views in "The fables of Ishango, or the irresistible temptation of mathematical fiction", answers and updates"
