= Lebombo bone =

Paleolithic artefact from South Africa

The Lebombo bone is a bone tool made of a baboon fibula with incised markings discovered in Border Cave in the Lebombo Mountains located between South Africa and Eswatini. Changes in the section of the notches indicate the use of different cutting edges, which the bone's discoverer, Peter Beaumont, views as evidence for their having been made, like other markings found all over the world, during participation in rituals.

The bone is approximately 8cm long, and is between 42,000 and 43,000 years old, according to 24 radiocarbon datings. This is far older than the Ishango bone with which it is sometimes confused. Other notched bones are 80,000 years old but it is unclear if the notches are merely decorative or if they bear a functional meaning. The bone has been conjectured to be a tally stick.

== See also ==
- History of mathematics
- Tally sticks
- Ishango bone
