= Numeral (linguistics) =

Word or phrase which describes a numerical quantity

In linguistics, a numeral in the broadest sense is a word or phrase that describes a numerical quantity. Some theories of grammar use the word "numeral" to refer to cardinal numbers that act as a determiner that specify the quantity of a noun, for example the "two" in "two hats". Other theories of grammar do not include determiners as a part of speech and consider "two" in this example to be an adjective. Some theories consider "numeral" to be a synonym for "number" and assign all numbers (including ordinal numbers like "first") to a part of speech called "numerals". Numerals in the broad sense can also be analyzed as a noun ("three is a small number"), as a pronoun ("the two went to town"), or for a small number of words as an adverb ("I rode the slide twice").

Numerals can express relationships like quantity (cardinal numbers), sequence (ordinal numbers), frequency (once, twice), and part (fraction).

== Identifying numerals ==
Numerals may be attributive, as in two dogs, or pronominal, as in I saw two (of them).

Words across various parts of speech often denote number or quantity. Such words are called quantifiers. Examples are words such as every, most, least, some, etc. Numerals are distinguished from other quantifiers by the fact that they designate a specific number. Examples are words such as five, ten, fifty, one hundred, etc. They may or may not be treated as a distinct part of speech; this may vary, not only with the language, but with the choice of word. For example, "dozen" serves the function of a noun, "first" serves the function of an adjective, and "twice" serves the function of an adverb. In Old Church Slavonic, the cardinal numbers 5 to 10 were feminine nouns; when quantifying a noun, that noun was declined in the genitive plural like other nouns that followed a noun of quantity (one would say the equivalent of "five of people"). In English grammar, the classification "numeral" (viewed as a part of speech) is reserved for those words which have distinct grammatical behavior: when a numeral modifies a noun, it may replace the article: the/some dogs played in the park → twelve dogs played in the park. (*dozen dogs played in the park is not grammatical, so "dozen" is not a numeral in this sense.) English numerals indicate cardinal numbers. However, not all words for cardinal numbers are necessarily numerals. For example, million is grammatically a noun, and must be preceded by an article or numeral itself.

Numerals may be simple, such as 'eleven', or compound, such as 'twenty-three'.

In linguistics, however, numerals are classified according to purpose: examples are ordinal numbers (first, second, third, etc.; from 'third' up, these are also used for fractional numerals in English, but other languages distinguish the two completely), multiplicative (adverbial) numbers (once, twice, and thrice), multipliers (single, double, and triple), and distributive numbers (singly, doubly, and triply). Georgian, Latin, and Romanian (see Romanian distributive numbers) have regular distributive numbers, such as Latin singuli "one-by-one", bini "in pairs, two-by-two", terni "three each", etc. In languages other than English, there may be other kinds of number words. For example, in Slavic languages there are collective numbers (monad, pair/dyad, triad) which describe sets, such as pair or dozen in English (see Russian numerals, Polish numerals).

Some languages have a very limited set of numerals, and in some cases they arguably do not have any numerals at all, but instead use more generic quantifiers, such as 'pair' or 'many'. However, by now most such languages have borrowed the numeral system or part of the numeral system of a national or colonial language, though in a few cases (such as Guarani), a numeral system has been invented internally rather than borrowed. Other languages had an indigenous system but borrowed a second set of numerals anyway. Two examples are Japanese and Korean, which use either native or Chinese-derived numerals depending on what is being counted.

In many languages, such as Chinese, numerals require the use of numeral classifiers. Many sign languages, such as ASL, incorporate numerals.

== Larger numerals ==
English has derived numerals for multiples of its base (fifty, sixty, etc.), and some languages have simplex numerals for these, or even for numbers between the multiples of its base. Balinese, for example, currently has a decimal system, with words for 10, 100, and 1000, but has additional simplex numerals for 25 (with a second word for 25 only found in a compound for 75), 35, 45, 50, 150, 175, 200 (with a second found in a compound for 1200), 400, 900, and 1600. In Hindustani, the numerals between 10 and 100 have developed to the extent that they need to be learned independently.

In many languages, numerals up to the base are a distinct part of speech, while the words for powers of the base belong to one of the other word classes. In English, these higher words are hundred 10^{2}, thousand 10^{3}, million 10^{6}, and higher powers of a thousand (short scale) or of a million (long scale—see names of large numbers). These words cannot modify a noun without being preceded by an article or numeral (*hundred dogs played in the park), and so are nouns.

In East Asia, the higher units are hundred, thousand, myriad 10^{4}, and powers of myriad. In the Indian subcontinent, they are hundred, thousand, lakh 10^{5}, crore 10^{7}, and so on. The Mesoamerican system, still used to some extent in Mayan languages, was based on powers of 20: bak’ 400 (20^{2}), pik 8000 (20^{3}), kalab 160,000 (20^{4}), kinchil 3,200,000 (20^{5}), alau 64,000,000 (20^{6}) and hablat 1,280,000,000 (20^{7}).

== Numerals of cardinal numbers ==
The cardinal numbers have numerals. In the following tables, [and] indicates that the word and is used in some dialects (such as in Standard British English and by many American speakers), and omitted in other dialects (as prescribed by many style guides for Standard American English).

This table demonstrates the standard English construction of some cardinal numbers. (See next table for names of larger cardinals.)

Value	Name	Alternate names, and names for sets of the given size
0	Zero	aught, cipher, cypher, donut, dot, duck, goose egg, love, nada, naught, nil, none, nought, nowt, null, ought, oh, squat, zed, zilch, zip, zippo
1	One	ace, individual, single, singleton, unary, unit, unity
2	Two	binary, brace, couple, couplet, distich, deuce, double, doubleton, duad, duality, duet, duo, dyad, pair, span, twain, twin, twosome, yoke
3	Three	deuce-ace, leash, set, tercet, ternary, ternion, terzetto, threesome, tierce, trey, triad, trine, trinity, trio, triplet, troika, hat-trick
4	Four	foursome, quadruplet, quatern, quaternary, quaternity, quartet, tetrad
5	Five	cinque, fin, fivesome, pentad, quint, quintet, quintuplet
6	Six	half dozen, hexad, sestet, sextet, sextuplet, sise
7	Seven	heptad, septet, septuple
8	Eight	octad, octave, octet, octonary, octuplet, ogdoad
9	Nine	ennead
10	Ten	deca, decade, das (India)
11	Eleven	onze, ounze, ounce, banker's dozen
12	Twelve	dozen
13	Thirteen	baker's dozen, long dozen
16	Sixteen	hex
20	Twenty	score
21	Twenty-one	long score, blackjack
22	Twenty-two	Deuce-deuce
24	Twenty-four	two dozen
40	Forty	two-score
50	Fifty	half-century
55	Fifty-five	double nickel
60	Sixty	three-score, shock
64	Sixty-four	stack
70	Seventy	three-score and ten
80	Eighty	four-score
87	Eighty-seven	four-score and seven
90	Ninety	four-score and ten
100	One hundred	centred, century, ton, short hundred
111	One hundred [and] eleven	eleventy-one
120	One hundred [and] twenty	long hundred, great hundred, (obsolete) hundred
144	One hundred [and] forty-four	gross, dozen dozen, small gross
1000	One thousand	chiliad, grand, G, thou, yard, kilo, k, millennium, Hajaar (India), ten hundred
1024	One thousand [and] twenty-four	kibi or kilo in computing, see binary prefix (kilo is shortened to K, Kibi to Ki)
1100	One thousand one hundred	Eleven hundred
1728	One thousand seven hundred [and] twenty-eight	great gross, long gross, dozen gross
10000	Ten thousand	myriad, wan (China)
100000	One hundred thousand	lakh, lac
500000	Five hundred thousand	crore (Iranian)
1000000	One million	Mega, meg, mil (often shortened to M)
1048576	One million forty-eight thousand five hundred [and] seventy-six	Mibi or Mega in computing, see binary prefix (Mega is shortened to M, Mibi to Mi)
10000000	Ten million	crore (India, Pakistan)
100000000	One hundred million	yi (China)
1000000000	One billion	arab, bil, milliard (see below)
100000000000	One hundred billion	kharab

=== English names for powers of 10 ===
This table compares the English names of cardinal numbers according to various American, British, and Continental European conventions. See English numerals or names of large numbers for more information on naming numbers.

	Short scale	Long scale	
Value	American	British (Nicolas Chuquet)	Continental European (Jacques Peletier du Mans)
10^{0}	One		
10^{1}	Ten		
10^{2}	Hundred		
10^{3}	Thousand		
10^{6}	Million		
10^{9}	Billion	Thousand million	Milliard
10^{12}	Trillion	Billion	
10^{15}	Quadrillion	Thousand billion	Billiard
10^{18}	Quintillion	Trillion	
10^{21}	Sextillion	Thousand trillion	Trilliard
10^{24}	Septillion	Quadrillion	
10^{27}	Octillion	Thousand quadrillion	Quadrilliard
10^{30}	Nonillion	Quintillion	
10^{33}	Decillion	Thousand quintillion	Quintilliard
10^{36}	Undecillion	Sextillion	
10^{39}	Duodecillion	Thousand sextillion	Sextilliard
10^{42}	Tredecillion	Septillion	
10^{45}	Quattuordecillion	Thousand septillion	Septilliard
10^{48}	Quindecillion	Octillion	
10^{51}	Sexdecillion	Thousand octillion	Octilliard
10^{54}	Septendecillion	Nonillion	
10^{57}	Octodecillion	Thousand nonillion	Nonilliard
10^{60}	Novemdecillion	Decillion	
10^{63}	Vigintillion	Thousand decillion	Decilliard
10^{66}	Unvigintillion	Undecillion	
10^{69}	Duovigintillion	Thousand undecillion	Undecilliard
10^{72}	Trevigintillion	Duodecillion	
10^{75}	Quattuorvigintillion	Thousand duodecillion	Duodecilliard
10^{78}	Quinvigintillion	Tredecillion	
10^{81}	Sexvigintillion	Thousand tredecillion	Tredecilliard
10^{84}	Septenvigintillion	Quattuordecillion	
10^{87}	Octovigintillion	Thousand quattuordecillion	Quattuordecilliard
10^{90}	Novemvigintillion	Quindecillion	
10^{93}	Trigintillion	Thousand quindecillion	Quindecilliard
10^{96}	Untrigintillion	Sexdecillion	
10^{99}	Duotrigintillion	Thousand sexdecillion	Sexdecilliard
10^{120}	Novemtrigintillion	Vigintillion	
10^{123}	Quadragintillion	Thousand vigintillion	Vigintilliard
10^{153}	Quinquagintillion	Thousand quinvigintillion	Quinvigintilliard
10^{180}	Novemquinquagintillion	Trigintillion	
10^{183}	Sexagintillion	Thousand trigintillion	Trigintilliard
10^{213}	Septuagintillion	Thousand quintrigintillion	Quintrigintilliard
10^{240}	Novemseptuagintillion	Quadragintillion	
10^{243}	Octogintillion	Thousand quadragintillion	Quadragintilliard
10^{273}	Nonagintillion	Thousand quinquadragintillion	Quinquadragintilliard
10^{300}	Novemnonagintillion	Quinquagintillion	
10^{303}	Centillion	Thousand quinquagintillion	Quinquagintilliard
10^{360}	Cennovemdecillion	Sexagintillion	
10^{420}	Cennovemtrigintillion	Septuagintillion	
10^{480}	Cennovemquinquagintillion	Octogintillion	
10^{540}	Cennovemseptuagintillion	Nonagintillion	
10^{600}	Cennovemnonagintillion	Centillion	
10^{603}	Ducentillion	Thousand centillion	Centilliard

There is no consistent and widely accepted way to extend cardinals beyond centillion (centilliard).

=== Myriad, Octad, and -yllion systems ===
The following table details the myriad, octad, Ancient Greek Archimedes's notation, Chinese myriad, Chinese long and -yllion names for powers of 10.

There is also a Knuth-proposed system notation of numbers, named the -yllion system. In this system, a new word is invented for every 2^{n}-th power of ten.

Value	Myriad System Name	Octad System Name	Ancient Greek Myriad Scale	Chinese Myriad Scale	Chinese Long Scale	Knuth-proposed System Name
10^{0}	One	One	εἷς (heîs)	一	一	One
10^{1}	Ten	Ten	δέκα (déka)	十	十	Ten
10^{2}	Hundred	Hundred	ἑκατόν (hekatón)	百	百	Hundred
10^{3}	Thousand	Thousand	χίλιοι (khī́lioi)	千	千	Ten hundred
10^{4}	Myriad	Myriad	μύριοι (mýrioi)	萬 (万)	萬 (万)	Myriad
10^{5}	Ten myriad	Ten myriad	δεκάκις μύριοι (dekákis mýrioi)	十萬 (十万)	十萬 (十万)	Ten myriad
10^{6}	Hundred myriad	Hundred myriad	ἑκατοντάκις μύριοι (hekatontákis mýrioi)	百萬 (百万)	百萬 (百万)	Hundred myriad
10^{7}	Thousand myriad	Thousand myriad	χιλιάκις μύριοι (khiliákis mýrioi)	千萬 (千万)	千萬 (千万)	Ten hundred myriad
10^{8}	Second myriad	Octad	μυριάκις μύριοι (muriákis mýrioi)	億 (亿)	億 (亿)	Myllion
10^{9}	Ten second myriad	Ten octad	δεκάκις μυριάκις μύριοι (dekákis muriákis múrioi)	十億 (十亿)	十億 (十亿)	Ten myllion
10^{10}	Hundred second myriad	Hundred octad	ἑκατοντάκις μυριάκις μύριοι (hekatontákis muriákis múrioi)	百億 (百亿)	百億 (百亿)	Hundred myllion
10^{11}	Thousand second myriad	Thousand octad	χῑλῐάκῐς μυριάκις μύριοι (khīliákis muriákis múrioi)	千億 (千亿)	千億 (千亿)	Ten hundred myllion
10^{12}	Third myriad	Myriad octad	μυριάκις μυριάκις μύριοι (muriákis muriákis mýrioi)	兆	萬億 (万亿)	Myriad myllion
10^{13}	Ten third myriad	Ten myriad octad	δεκάκις μυριάκις μυριάκις μύριοι (dekákis muriákis muriákis mýrioi)	十兆	十萬億 (十万亿)	Ten myriad myllion
10^{14}	Hundred third myriad	Hundred myriad octad	ἑκατοντάκις μυριάκις μυριάκις μύριοι (hekatontákis muriákis muriákis mýrioi)	百兆	百萬億 (百万亿)	Hundred myriad myllion
10^{15}	Thousand third myriad	Thousand myriad octad	χιλιάκις μυριάκις μυριάκις μύριοι (khiliákis muriákis muriákis mýrioi)	千兆	千萬億 (千万亿)	Ten hundred myriad myllion
10^{16}	Fourth myriad	Second octad	μυριάκις μυριάκις μυριάκις μύριοι (muriákis muriákis muriákis mýrioi)	京	兆	Byllion
10^{17}	Ten fourth myriad	Ten second octad	δεκάκις μυριάκις μυριάκις μυριάκις μύριοι (dekákis muriákis muriákis muriákis mýrioi)	十京	十兆	Ten byllion
10^{18}	Hundred fourth myriad	Hundred second octad	ἑκατοντάκις μυριάκις μυριάκις μυριάκις μύριοι (hekatontákis muriákis muriákis muriákis mýrioi)	百京	百兆	Hundred byllion
10^{19}	Thousand fourth myriad	Thousand second octad	χιλιάκις μυριάκις μυριάκις μυριάκις μύριοι (khiliákis muriákis muriákis muriákis mýrioi)	千京	千兆	Ten hundred byllion
10^{20}	Fifth myriad	Myriad second octad	μυριάκις μυριάκις μυριάκις μυριάκις μύριοι (muriákis muriákis muriákis muriákis mýrioi)	垓	萬兆	Myriad byllion
10^{21}	Ten fifth myriad	Ten myriad second octad	δεκάκις μυριάκις μυριάκις μυριάκις μυριάκις μύριοι (dekákis muriákis muriákis muriákis muriákis mýrioi)	十垓	十萬兆	Ten myriad byllion
10^{22}	Hundred fifth myriad	Hundred myriad second octad	ἑκατοντάκις μυριάκις μυριάκις μυριάκις μυριάκις μύριοι (hekatontákis muriákis muriákis muriákis muriákis mýrioi)	百垓	百萬兆	Hundred myriad byllion
10^{23}	Thousand fifth myriad	Thousand myriad second octad	χιλιάκις μυριάκις μυριάκις μυριάκις μυριάκις μύριοι (khiliákis muriákis muriákis muriákis muriákis mýrioi)	千垓	千萬兆	Ten hundred myriad byllion
10^{24}	Sixth myriad	Third octad	μυριάκις μυριάκις μυριάκις μυριάκις μυριάκις μύριοι (muriákis muriákis muriákis muriákis muriákis mýrioi)	秭 (in China); 𥝱 (in Japan)	億兆	Myllion byllion
10^{28}	Seventh myriad	Myriad third octad		穰	萬億兆	Myriad myllion byllion
10^{32}	Eighth myriad	Fourth octad		溝 (沟)	京	Tryllion
10^{36}	Ninth myriad	Myriad fourth octad		澗 (涧)	萬京	Myriad tryllion
10^{40}	Tenth myriad	Fifth octad		正	億京	Myllion tryllion
10^{44}	Eleventh myriad	Myriad fifth octad		載 (载)	萬億京	Myriad myllion tryllion
10^{48}	Twelfth myriad	Sixth octad		極 (极) (in China and in Japan)	兆京	Byllion tryllion
10^{52}	Thirteenth myriad	Myriad sixth octad		恆河沙 (恒河沙) (in China)	萬兆京	Myriad byllion tryllion
10^{56}	Fourteenth myriad	Seventh octad		阿僧祇 (in China); 恒河沙 (in Japan)	億兆京	Myllion byllion tryllion
10^{60}	Fifteenth myriad	Myriad seventh octad		那由他, 那由多 (in China)	萬億兆京	Myriad myllion byllion tryllion
10^{64}	Sixteenth myriad	Eighth octad		不可思議 (不可思议) (in China), 阿僧祇 (in Japan)	垓	Quadyllion
10^{68}	Seventeenth myriad	Myriad eighth octad		無量大數 (无量大数) (in China)	萬垓	Myriad quadyllion
10^{72}	Eighteenth myriad	Ninth octad		那由他, 那由多 (in Japan)	億垓	Myllion quadyllion
10^{80}	Twentieth myriad	Tenth octad		不可思議 (in Japan)	兆垓	Byllion quadyllion
10^{88}	Twenty-second myriad	Eleventh octad		無量大数 (in Japan)	億兆垓	Myllion byllion quadyllion
10^{128}	Thirty-second myriad	Sixteenth octad			秭	Quinyllion
10^{256}	Sixty-fourth myriad	Thirty-second octad			穰	Sexyllion
10^{512}	128th myriad	Sixty-fourth octad			溝 (沟)	Septyllion
10^{1,024}	256th myriad	128th octad			澗 (涧)	Octyllion
10^{2,048}	512th myriad	256th octad			正	Nonyllion
10^{4,096}	1024th myriad	512th octad			載 (载)	Decyllion
10^{8,192}	2048th myriad	1024th octad			極 (极)	Undecyllion
10^{16,384}	4096th myriad	2048th octad			恆河沙 (恒河沙)	Duodecyllion
10^{32,768}	8192nd myriad	4096th octad			阿僧祇	Tredecyllion
10^{65,536}	16384th myriad	8192nd octad			那由他, 那由多	Quattuordecyllion
10^{131,072}	32768th myriad	16384th octad			不可思議 (不可思议)	Quindecyllion
10^{262,144}	65536th myriad	32768th octad			無量大數 (无量大数)	Sexdecyllion
10^{524,288}	131072nd myriad	65536th octad				Septendecyllion
10^{1,048,576}	262144th myriad	131072nd octad				Octodecyllion
10^{2,097,152}	524288th myriad	262144th octad				Novemdecyllion
10^{4,194,304}	1048576th myriad	524288th octad				Vigintyllion
10^{2^{32}}	1073741824th myriad	536870912th octad				Trigintyllion
10^{2^{42}}	1099511627776th myriad	549755813888th octad				Quadragintyllion
10^{2^{52}}						Quinquagintyllion
10^{2^{62}}						Sexagintyllion
10^{2^{72}}						Septuagintyllion
10^{2^{82}}						Octogintyllion
10^{2^{92}}						Nonagintyllion
10^{2^{102}}						Centyllion
10^{2^{1,002}}						Millyllion
10^{2^{10,002}}						Myryllion

== Fractional numerals ==
Fractional numerals express fractions. Individual fractional words can form larger fractional expressions: English third is a fractional noun, thirds is its plural form, and two thirds is a noun phrase containing that form. Languages differ in their fractional vocabulary and in the constructions that combine expressions for the numerator and denominator.

An English fractional noun identifies a type of part: third specifies one of three equal parts of a whole. A preceding cardinal numeral specifies how many such parts are included, as in one third and two thirds. The noun heads the phrase and inflects for number. The article a or an can replace one.

Fractional expressions can occur in partitive constructions, as in a third of the cake. They can also precede expressions of quantity, as in two thirds the size. Half has a wider distribution: it can occur without a preceding article or numeral in expressions such as half the cake and half a day.

In English, the forms of fractional nouns correspond almost entirely to those of ordinal numerals: compare ordinal third in the third chapter with fractional third in a third of the book, or twenty-fifth in the twenty-fifth chapter and one twenty-fifth of the book. The principal exceptions are half (rather than second) and quarter (an alternative to fourth). Despite their shared forms, the two uses have different grammatical properties. Ordinals are adjectives, whereas fractionals are count nouns that can take determiners and inflect for number, as in two thirds and the lower third. The formal relationship between fractionals and other numerals varies across languages. Some, like English, have forms identical or morphologically related to ordinals, whereas others use distinct fractional words or constructions based on cardinal numerals.

The following complete expressions all denote 2/3:

Language	Complete fractional expression	Structure
English	two thirds	Cardinal numeral followed by thirds, the plural form of the fractional noun third.
German	zwei Drittel	Numerator followed by the fractional noun Drittel, formed with the suffix -tel.
Mandarin Chinese	三分之二 (sān fēn zhī èr)	Cardinal denominator followed by 分之 (fēn zhī) and the cardinal numerator.
Turkish	üçte iki	Denominator üç (3) with the locative case ending -te, followed by the numerator iki (2).

The Mandarin and Turkish examples use cardinal numerals for both numerical components, without a fractional noun corresponding to English third. Mandarin uses the same pattern for fractions greater than one, as in 五分之六 (wǔ fēn zhī liù, 'six fifths').

A language may have more than one construction for expressing fractions. Turkish also permits the numerator to come first with bölü ('divided by'), as in iki bölü beş ('two fifths'). Special fractional words can have different grammatical distributions: compare Turkish yarım bardak ('half a glass') and iki buçuk ('two and a half').

== Other specific quantity terms ==
Various terms have arisen to describe commonly used measured quantities.

- Unit: 1 (based on a single entity of counting or measurement of an object or item)
- Pair: 2 (the base of the binary numeral system)
- Leash: 3 (the base of the trinary numeral system)
- Dozen: 12 (the base of the duodecimal numeral system)
- Baker's dozen: 13 (based on a group of thirteen objects or items)
- Score: 20 (the base of the vigesimal numeral system)
- Shock: 60 (the base of the sexagesimal numeral system)
- Gross: (based on a group of 144 objects or items)
- Great gross: (based on a group of 1,728 objects or items)

== Basis of counting system ==
Not all peoples use counting, at least not verbally. Specifically, there is not much need for counting among hunter-gatherers who do not engage in commerce. Many languages around the world have no numerals above two to four (if they are actually numerals at all, and not some other part of speech)—or at least did not before contact with the colonial societies—and speakers of these languages may have no tradition of using the numerals they did have for counting. Indeed, several languages from the Amazon have been independently reported to have no specific number words other than 'one'. These include Nadëb, pre-contact Mocoví and Pilagá, Culina and pre-contact Jarawara, Jabutí, Canela-Krahô, Botocudo (Krenák), Chiquitano, the Campa languages, Arabela, and Achuar. Some languages of Australia, such as Warlpiri, do not have words for quantities above two, and neither did many Khoisan languages at the time of European contact. Such languages do not have a word class of 'numeral'.

Most languages with both numerals and counting use base 8, 10, 12, or 20. Base 10 appears to come from counting one's fingers, base 20 from the fingers and toes, base 8 from counting the spaces between the fingers (attested in California), and base 12 from counting the knuckles (3 each for the four fingers).

=== No base ===
Many languages of Melanesia have (or once had) counting systems based on parts of the body which do not have a numeric base; there are (or were) no numerals, but rather nouns for relevant parts of the body—or simply pointing to the relevant spots—were used for quantities. For example, 1–4 may be the fingers, 5 'thumb', 6 'wrist', 7 'elbow', 8 'shoulder', etc., across the body and down the other arm, so that the opposite little finger represents a number between 17 (Torres Islands) to 23 (Eleman). For numbers beyond this, the torso, legs and toes may be used, or one might count back up the other arm and back down the first, depending on the people.

=== 2: binary ===
Binary systems are based on the number 2, using zeros and ones. Due to its simplicity, only having two distinct digits, binary is commonly used in computing, with zero and one often corresponding to "off/on" respectively.

=== 3: ternary ===
Ternary systems are based on the number 3, having practical usage in some analog logic, in baseball scoring and in self–similar mathematical structures.

=== 4: quaternary ===
Quaternary systems are based on the number 4. Some Austronesian, Melanesian, Sulawesi, and Papua New Guinea ethnic groups, count with the base number four, using the term asu or aso, the word for dog, as the ubiquitous village dog has four legs. This is argued by anthropologists to be also based on early humans noting the human and animal shared body feature of two arms and two legs as well as its ease in simple arithmetic and counting. As an example of the system's ease a realistic scenario could include a farmer returning from the market with fifty asu heads of pig (200), less 30 asu (120) of pig bartered for 10 asu (40) of goats noting his new pig count total as twenty asu: 80 pigs remaining. The system has a correlation to the dozen counting system and is still in common use in these areas as a natural and easy method of simple arithmetic.

=== 5: quinary ===
Quinary systems are based on the number 5. It is almost certain the quinary system developed from counting by fingers (five fingers per hand). An example are the Epi languages of Vanuatu, where 5 is luna 'hand', 10 lua-luna 'two hand', 15 tolu-luna 'three hand', etc. 11 is then lua-luna tai 'two-hand one', and 17 tolu-luna lua 'three-hand two'.

5 is a common auxiliary base, or sub-base, where 6 is 'five and one', 7 'five and two', etc. Aztec was a vigesimal (base-20) system with sub-base 5.

=== 6: senary ===
Senary systems are based on the number 6. The Morehead-Maro languages of Southern New Guinea are examples of the rare base 6 system with monomorphemic words running up to 6^{6}. Examples are Kanum and Kómnzo. The Sko languages on the North Coast of New Guinea follow a base-24 system with a sub-base of 6.

=== 7: septenary ===
Septenary systems are based on the number 7. Septenary systems are very rare, as few natural objects consistently have seven distinctive features. Traditionally, it occurs in week-related timing. It has been suggested that the Palikúr language has a base-seven system, but this is dubious.

=== 8: octal ===
Octal systems are based on the number 8. Examples can be found in the Yuki language of California and in the Pamean languages of Mexico, because the Yuki and Pame keep count by using the four spaces between their fingers rather than the fingers themselves.

=== 9: nonary ===
Nonary systems are based on the number 9. It has been suggested that Nenets has a base-nine system.

=== 10: decimal ===
Decimal systems are based on the number 10. A majority of traditional number systems are decimal. This dates back at least to the ancient Egyptians, who used a wholly decimal system. Anthropologists hypothesize this may be due to humans having five digits per hand, ten in total. There are many regional variations including:

- Western system: based on thousands, with variants (see English numerals)
- Indian system: crore, lakh (see Indian numbering system. Indian numerals)
- East Asian system: based on ten-thousands (see below)

=== 12: duodecimal ===
Duodecimal systems are based on the number 12.

These include:

- Chepang language of Nepal,
- Mahl language of Minicoy Island in India
- Nigerian Middle Belt areas such as Janji, Kahugu and the Nimbia dialect of Gwandara.
- reconstructed proto-Benue–Congo

Duodecimal numeric systems have some practical advantages over decimal. It is much easier to divide the base digit twelve (which is a highly composite number) by many important divisors in market and trade settings, such as the numbers 2, 3, 4 and 6.

Because of several measurements based on twelve, many Western languages have words for base-twelve units such as dozen, gross and great gross, which allow for rudimentary duodecimal nomenclature, such as "two gross six dozen" for 360. Ancient Romans used a decimal system for integers, but switched to duodecimal for fractions, and correspondingly Latin developed a rich vocabulary for duodecimal-based fractions (see Roman numerals). A notable fictional duodecimal system was that of J. R. R. Tolkien's Elvish languages, which used duodecimal as well as decimal.

=== 16: hexadecimal ===
Hexadecimal systems are based on the number 16.

The traditional Chinese units of measurement were base-16. For example, one jīn (斤) in the old system equals sixteen taels. The suanpan (Chinese abacus) can be used to perform hexadecimal calculations such as additions and subtractions.

South Asian monetary systems were base-16. One rupee in Pakistan and India was divided into 16 annay. A single anna was subdivided into four paisa or twelve pies (thus there were 64 paise or 192 pies in a rupee). The anna was demonetised as a currency unit when India decimalised its currency in 1957, followed by Pakistan in 1961.

=== 20: vigesimal ===
Vigesimal systems are based on the number 20. Anthropologists are convinced the system originated from digit counting, as did bases five and ten, twenty being the number of human fingers and toes combined. The system is in widespread use across the world. Some include the classical Mesoamerican cultures, still in use today in the modern indigenous languages of their descendants, namely the Nahuatl and Mayan languages (see Maya numerals). A modern national language which uses a full vigesimal system is Dzongkha in Bhutan.

Partial vigesimal systems are found in some languages: Basque, Celtic languages, French (from Celtic), Danish, and Georgian. In these languages the systems are vigesimal up to 99, then decimal from 100 up. That is, 140 is 'one hundred two score', not *seven score, and there is no numeral for 400 (great score).

The term score originates from tally sticks, and is perhaps a remnant of Celtic vigesimal counting. It was widely used to learn the pre-decimal British currency in this idiom: "a dozen pence and a score of bob", referring to the 20 shillings in a pound. For Americans the term is most known from the opening of the Gettysburg Address: "Four score and seven years ago our fathers...".

=== 24: quadrovigesimal ===
Quadrovigesimal systems are based on the number 24. The Sko languages have a base-24 system with a sub-base of 6.

=== 32: duotrigesimal ===
Duotrigesimal systems are based on the number 32. The Ngiti ethnolinguistic group uses a base 32 numeral system.

=== 60: sexagesimal ===
Sexagesimal systems are based on the number 60. Ekari has a base-60 system. Sumeria had a base-60 system with a decimal sub-base (with alternating cycles of 10 and 6), which was the origin of the numbering of modern degrees, minutes, and seconds.

=== 80: octogesimal ===
Octogesimal systems are based on the number 80. Supyire is said to have a base-80 system; it counts in twenties (with 5 and 10 as sub-bases) up to 80, then by eighties up to 400, and then by 400s (great scores).

kàmpwóò ŋ̀kwuu sicyɛɛré ná béé-tàànre ná kɛ́ ná báár-ìcyɛ̀ɛ̀rè
{four hundred} eighty four and twenty-three and ten and five-four

799 [i.e. 400 + (4 x 80) + (3 x 20) + {10 + (5 + 4)}]’

== See also ==
=== Numerals in various languages ===
A database Numeral Systems of the World's Languages compiled by Eugene S.L. Chan of Hong Kong is hosted by the Max Planck Institute for Evolutionary Anthropology in Leipzig, Germany. The database currently contains data for about 4000 languages.

- Proto-Indo-European numerals
  - English numerals
  - Indian numbering system
  - Latin numerals
  - Polish numerals
  - Hindustani numerals
- Proto-Semitic numerals
  - Hebrew numerals
- Chinese numerals
  - Japanese numerals
  - Korean numerals
  - Vietnamese numerals
- Australian Aboriginal enumeration
- Hindu-Arabic numeral system
  - Thai numerals
- Balinese numerals
- Dzongkha numerals
- Finnish numerals
- Javanese numerals
- Yoruba numerals

=== Related topics ===
- Long and short scales
- Names of large numbers
- Numeral system
- Numeral prefix
- Names of small numbers
