= Byllion =

Byllion may refer to:

- 10^{12} (long-scale billion) in Nicolas Chuquet's nomenclature, see Names of large numbers#Origins of the "standard dictionary numbers"
- 10^{16} in Donald Knuth's -yllion nomenclature
