= Tryllion =

Tryllion may refer to:

- 10^{18} (long-scale trillion) in Nicolas Chuquet's nomenclature, see Names of large numbers#Origins of the "standard dictionary numbers"
- 10^{32} in Donald Knuth's -yllion nomenclature
