= Sextillion (disambiguation) =

Sextillion may mean either of the two numbers (see long and short scales for more detail):

- 1,000,000,000,000,000,000,000 (one thousand million million million; 10^{21}; SI prefix zetta-) for all short scale countries
- 1,000,000,000,000,000,000,000,000,000,000,000,000 (one million million million million million million; 10^{36}) for all long scale countries

== See also ==
- Names of large numbers
