= Trillion =

12th or 18th power of ten

Visualization of 1 trillion (short scale)

Trillion is a number with two distinct definitions:

- 1,000,000,000,000, i.e. one million million, or 10^{12} (ten to the twelfth power), as defined on the short scale. This is now the meaning in both American and British English.
- 1,000,000,000,000,000,000, i.e. one million million million, or 10^{18} (ten to the eighteenth power), as defined on the long scale. This is one million times larger than the short scale trillion. This is the historical meaning in English and the current use in many non-English-speaking countries where trillion and billion 10^{12} (ten to the twelfth power) maintain their long scale definitions.

== Usage ==
Originally, the United Kingdom used the long scale trillion. However, since 1974, official UK statistics have used the short scale. Since the 1950s, the short scale has been increasingly used in technical writing and journalism, although the long scale definition still has some limited usage.

American English has always used the short scale definition.

Other countries use the word trillion (or words cognate to it) to denote either the long scale or short scale trillion. For details, see current usage.

During the height of hyperinflation in Zimbabwe in 2008, people became accustomed to speaking about their daily expenses in terms of trillions.

When Italy used the lira as currency, eventually converted at about 2,000 lira to the euro, it was found that Italians were more comfortable with words for large numbers such as trillion than British people.

== Etymology ==
Whilst the words billion and trillion, or variations thereof were first used by French mathematicians in the 15th century, the word trillion was first used in English in the 1680s and comes from the Italian word trilione.

The word originally meant the third power of one million. As a result, it was mainly used to express the concept of an enormous number, similar to the words zillion and gazillion. However, it was more commonly used in the US.

== See also ==
- Names of large numbers
