= -yllion =

Mathematical notation

-yllion (pronounced /aɪljən/) is a proposal from Donald Knuth for the terminology and symbols of an alternate decimal superbase system. In it, he adapts the familiar English terms for large numbers to provide a systematic set of names for much larger numbers. In addition to providing an extended range, -yllion also dodges the long and short scale ambiguity of -illion.

Knuth's digit grouping is exponential instead of linear; each division doubles the number of digits handled, whereas the familiar system only adds three or six more. His system is basically the same as one of the ancient and now-unused Chinese numeral systems, in which units stand for 10^{4}, 10^{8}, 10^{16}, 10^{32}, ..., 10^{2^{n}}, and so on (with an exception that the -yllion proposal does not use a word for thousand which the original Chinese numeral system has). Today the corresponding Chinese characters are used for 10^{4}, 10^{8}, 10^{12}, 10^{16}, and so on.

== Details and examples ==
In Knuth's -yllion proposal:

- 1 to 999 still have their usual names.
- 1000 to 9999 are divided before the 2nd-last digit and named "foo hundred bar." (e.g. 1234 is "twelve hundred thirty-four"; 7623 is "seventy-six hundred twenty-three")
- 10^{4} to 10^{8} − 1 are divided before the 4th-last digit and named "foo myriad bar". Knuth also introduces at this level a grouping symbol (comma) for the numeral. So 382,1902 is "three hundred eighty-two myriad nineteen hundred two."
- 10^{8} to 10^{16} − 1 are divided before the 8th-last digit and named "foo myllion bar", and a semicolon separates the digits. So 1,0002;0003,0004 is "one myriad two myllion, three myriad four."
- 10^{16} to 10^{32} − 1 are divided before the 16th-last digit and named "foo byllion bar", and a colon separates the digits. So 12:0003,0004;0506,7089 is "twelve byllion, three myriad four myllion, five hundred six myriad seventy hundred eighty-nine."
- etc.

Each new number name is the square of the previous one — therefore, each new name covers twice as many digits. Knuth continues borrowing the traditional names changing "illion" to "yllion" on each one. Abstractly, then, "one n-yllion" is $10^{2^{n+2}}$. "One trigintyllion" ($10^{2^{32}}$) would have 2^{32} + 1, or 42;9496,7297, or nearly forty-three myllion (4300 million) digits (by contrast, a conventional "trigintillion" has merely 94 digits — 7 digits short of a googol). "One centyllion" ($10^{2^{102}}$) would have 2^{102} + 1, or 507,0602;4009,1291:7605,9868;1282,1505, or about 1/20 of a tryllion digits, whereas a conventional "centillion" has only 304 digits.

The corresponding Chinese "long scale" numerals are given, with the traditional form listed before the simplified form. Same numerals are used in the Ancient Greek numeral system, and also the Chinese "short scale" (new number name every power of 10 after 1000 (or 10^{3+n})), "myriad scale" (new number name every 10^{4n}), and "mid scale" (new number name every 10^{8n}). Today these Chinese numerals are still in use, but are used in their "myriad scale" values, which is also used in Japanese and in Korean. For a more extensive table, see Myriad system.

Value	Name	Notation	Standard English name (short scale)	Ancient Greek	Chinese ("long scale")	Pīnyīn (Mandarin)	Jyutping (Cantonese)	Pe̍h-ōe-jī (Hokkien)
10^{0}	One	1	One	εἷς (heîs)	一	yī	jat^{1}	it/chit
10^{1}	Ten	10	Ten	δέκα (déka)	十	shí	sap^{6}	si̍p/cha̍p
10^{2}	One hundred	100	One hundred	ἑκατόν (hekatón)	百	bǎi	baak^{3}	pah
10^{3}	Ten hundred	1000	One thousand	χίλιοι (khī́lioi)	千	qiān	cin^{1}	chhian
10^{4}	One myriad	1,0000	Ten thousand	μύριοι (mýrioi)	萬, 万	wàn	maan^{6}	bān
10^{5}	Ten myriad	10,0000	One hundred thousand	δεκάκις μύριοι (dekákis mýrioi)	十萬, 十万	shíwàn	sap^{6} maan^{6}	si̍p/cha̍p bān
10^{6}	One hundred myriad	100,0000	One million	ἑκατοντάκις μύριοι (hekatontákis mýrioi)	百萬, 百万	bǎiwàn	baak^{3} maan^{6}	pah bān
10^{7}	Ten hundred myriad	1000,0000	Ten million	χιλιάκις μύριοι (khiliákis mýrioi)	千萬, 千万	qiānwàn	cin^{1} maan^{6}	chhian bān
10^{8}	One myllion	1;0000,0000	One hundred million	μυριάκις μύριοι (muriákis mýrioi)	億, 亿	yì	jik^{1}	ek
10^{9}	Ten myllion	10;0000,0000	One billion	δεκάκις μυριάκις μύριοι (dekákis muriákis mýrioi)	十億, 十亿	shíyì	sap^{6} jik^{1}	si̍p/cha̍p ek
10^{10}	One hundred myllion	100;0000,0000	Ten billion	ἑκατοντάκις μυριάκις μύριοι (hekatontákis muriákis múrioi)	百億, 百亿	bǎiyì	baak^{3} jik^{1}	pah ek
10^{11}	Ten hundred myllion	1000;0000,0000	One hundred billion	χῑλῐάκῐς μυριάκις μύριοι (khīliákis muriákis múrioi)	千億, 千亿	qiānyì	cin^{1} jik^{1}	chhian ek
10^{12}	One myriad myllion	1,0000;0000,0000	One trillion	μυριάκις μυριάκις μύριοι (muriákis muriákis mýrioi)	萬億, 万亿	wànyì	maan^{6} jik^{1}	bān ek
10^{13}	Ten myriad myllion	10,0000;0000,0000	Ten trillion	δεκάκις μυριάκις μυριάκις μύριοι (dekákis muriákis muriákis mýrioi)	十萬億, 十万亿	shíwànyì	sap^{6} maan^{6} jik^{1}	si̍p/cha̍p bān ek
10^{14}	One hundred myriad myllion	100,0000;0000,0000	One hundred trillion	ἑκατοντάκις μυριάκις μυριάκις μύριοι (hekatontákis muriákis muriákis mýrioi)	百萬億, 百万亿	bǎiwànyì	baak^{3} maan^{6} jik^{1}	pah bān ek
10^{15}	Ten hundred myriad myllion	1000,0000;0000,0000	One quadrillion	χιλιάκις μυριάκις μυριάκις μύριοι (khiliákis muriákis muriákis mýrioi)	千萬億, 千万亿	qiānwànyì	cin^{1} maan^{6} jik^{1}	chhian bān ek
10^{16}	One byllion	1:0000,0000;0000,0000	Ten quadrillion	μυριάκις μυριάκις μυριάκις μύριοι (muriákis muriákis muriákis mýrioi)	兆	zhào	siu^{6}	tiāu
10^{24}	One myllion byllion	1;0000,0000:0000,0000;0000,0000	One septillion	μυριάκις μυριάκις μυριάκις μυριάκις μυριάκις μύριοι (muriákis muriákis muriákis muriákis muriákis mýrioi)	億兆, 亿兆	yìzhào	jik^{1} siu^{6}	ek tiāu
10^{32}	One tryllion	1'0000,0000;0000,0000:0000,0000;0000,0000	One hundred nonillion	μυριάκις μυριάκις μυριάκις μυριάκις μυριάκις μυριάκις μυριάκις μύριοι (muriákis muriákis muriákis muriákis muriákis muriákis muriákis mýrioi)	京	jīng	ging^{1}	kiaⁿ
10^{64}	One quadryllion		Ten vigintillion		垓	gāi	goi^{1}	kai
10^{128}	One quintyllion		One hundred unquadragintillion		秭	zǐ	zi^{2}	chi
10^{256}	One sextyllion		Ten quattuoroctogintillion		穰	ráng	joeng^{4}	liōng
10^{512}	One septyllion		One hundred novensexagintacentillion		溝, 沟	gōu	kau^{1}	kau
10^{1024}	One octyllion		Ten quadragintatrecentillion		澗, 涧	jiàn	gaan^{3}	kán
10^{2048}	One nonyllion		One hundred unoctogintasescentillion		正	zhēng	zing^{3}	chiàⁿ
10^{4096}	One decyllion		Ten milliquattuorsexagintatrecentillion		載, 载	zài	zoi^{3}	chài

== Latin- prefix ==
In order to construct names of the form n-yllion for large values of n, Knuth appends the prefix "latin-" to the name of n without spaces and uses that as the prefix for n. For example, the number "latintwohundredyllion" corresponds to n = 200, and hence to the number $10^{2^{202}}$.

== Negative powers ==
To refer to small quantities with this system, the suffix -th is used.

For instance, $10^{-4}$ is a myriadth. $10^{-16777216}$ is a vigintyllionth.

== See also ==
- Nicolas Chuquet – French mathematician (c.1445–c.1455 – c.1488–1500)
- Jacques Pelletier du Mans – French humanist, poet, mathematician (1517–1582)
- Knuth's up-arrow notation – Method of notation of very large integers
- The Sand Reckoner – Work by Archimedes
