= Billion =

Large number (thousand million or million million)

Billion is a word (in several languages) for a large number with two distinct definitions:

- 1,000,000,000, i.e. one thousand million, or 10^{9} (ten to the ninth power), as defined on the short scale (also known as a milliard on the long scale). This is now the most common sense of the word in all varieties of English; it has long been established in American English and has since become common in Britain and other English-speaking countries as well.
- 1,000,000,000,000, i.e. one million million, or 10^{12} (ten to the twelfth power), as defined on the long scale (that is, a trillion in the short scale). This number is the historical sense of the word and remains the established sense of the word in other European languages. Though displaced by the short scale definition relatively early in US English, it remained the most common sense of the word in Britain until the 1950s and still remains in occasional use there.

American English adopted the short scale definition from the French (it enjoyed usage in France at the time, alongside the long-scale definition). The United Kingdom used the long scale until 1974, when the government officially switched to the short scale, but since the 1950s the short scale had already been increasingly used in technical writing and journalism. Moreover, in 1941, Winston Churchill remarked: "For all practical financial purposes a billion represents one thousand millions..."

Other countries use the word billion (or words cognate to it) to denote either the long scale or short scale billion. Milliard, another term for one thousand million, is extremely rare in English, but it is an established term to refer to the short scale billion in many of these countries.

== History ==
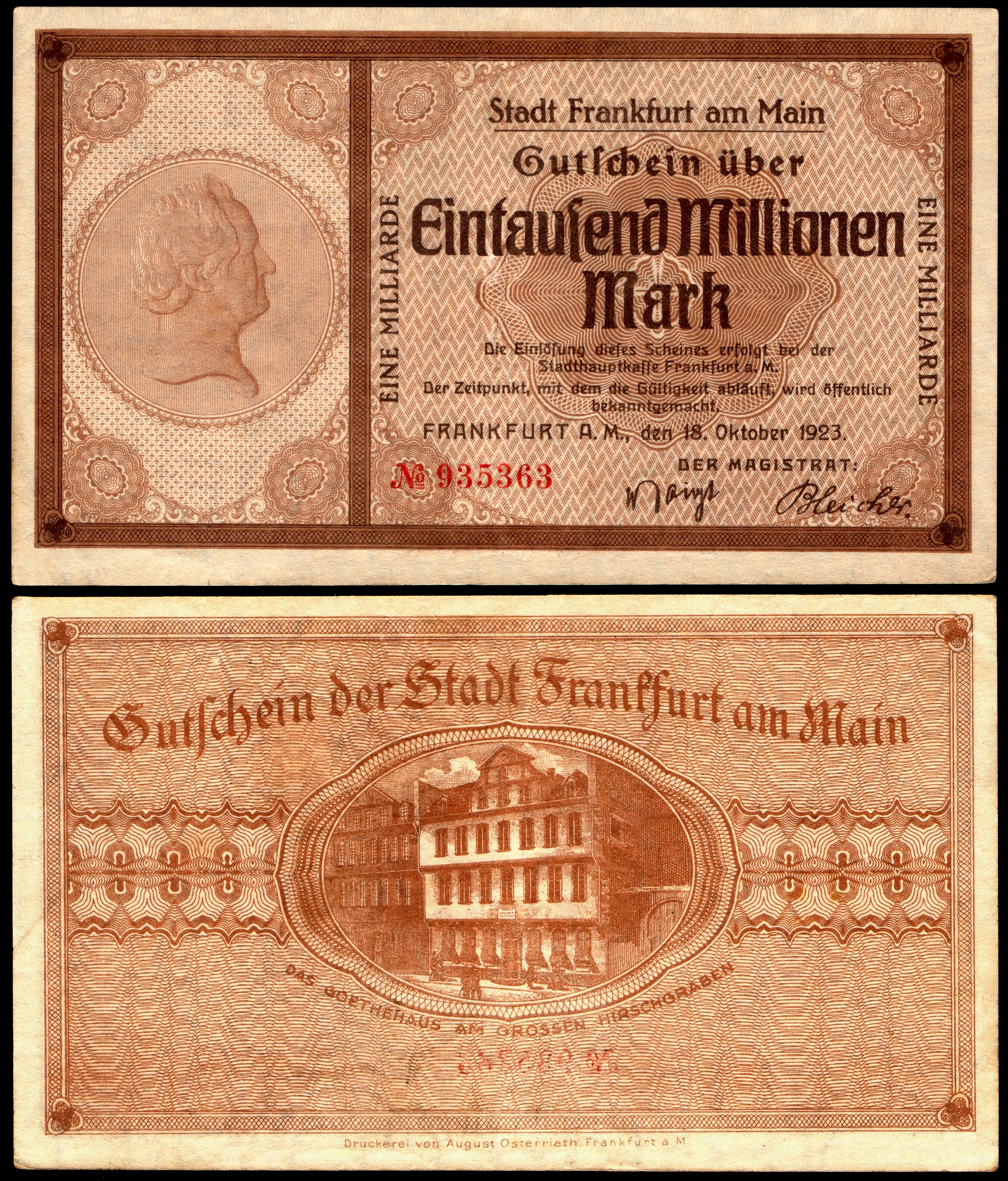
1000 million Mark Notgeld banknote (1923) of Frankfurt am Main

According to the Oxford English Dictionary, the word billion was formed in the 16th century (from million and the prefix bi-, "two"), meaning the second power of a million (1,000,000^{2} = 10^{12}). This long scale definition was similarly applied to trillion, quadrillion and so on. The words were originally Latin, and entered English around the end of the 17th century. Later, French arithmeticians changed the words' meanings, adopting the short scale definition whereby three zeros rather than six were added at each step, so a billion came to denote a thousand million (10^{9}), a trillion became a million million (10^{12}), and so on. This new convention was adopted in the United States in the 19th century, but Britain retained the original long scale use. France, in turn, reverted to the long scale in 1948.

In Britain, however, under the influence of American usage, the short scale came to be increasingly used. In 1974, Prime Minister Harold Wilson confirmed that the government would use the word billion only in its short scale meaning (one thousand million). In a written answer to Robin Maxwell-Hyslop MP, who asked whether official usage would conform to the traditional British meaning of a million million, Wilson stated: "No. The word 'billion' is now used internationally to mean 1,000 million and it would be confusing if British Ministers were to use it in any other sense. I accept that it could still be interpreted in this country as 1 million million and I shall ask my colleagues to ensure that, if they do use it, there should be no ambiguity as to its meaning."

== See also ==
- Names of large numbers
