= Umpty =

Umpty may refer to:

- Umpty, an indefinitely large number
- A possible source of the Australian place name Humpty Doo
