= Numeral =

Numeral may refer to:

- Numeral (mathematics), a symbol or group of symbols denoting a number.
- Numeral (linguistics), a part of speech denoting numbers, either as words or other symbols (e.g., one and first in English)

== See also ==
- Numerical digit, the glyphs used to represent numerals
- Numeral system used in mathematics
- Numerology, belief in a divine relationship between numbers and coinciding events
