= Indefinite and fictitious numbers =

Indefinite and fictitious numbers are words, phrases and quantities used to describe an indefinite size, used for comic effect, for exaggeration, as placeholder names, or when precision is unnecessary or undesirable. Other descriptions of this concept include: "non-numerical vague quantifier" and "indefinite hyperbolic numerals".

== Umpteen ==
Umpteen, umteen or umpty is an unspecified but large number, used in a humorous fashion or to imply that it is not worth the effort to pin down the actual figure. Despite the -teen ending, which would seem to indicate that it lies between 12 and 20, umpteen can be much larger.

The oldest reference to "umpty" — in a June 17, 1848 issue of the Louisville Morning Courier — indicates that at that time it was slang for empty. This is corroborated by a humorous short story in the North Carolina Hillsborough Recorder of June 30, 1852.

By 1905, "umpty", in the expression "umpty-seven", had come to imply a multiple of ten. Umpty came from a verbalization of a dash in Morse code.

"Umpteen", adding the ending -teen, as in "thirteen", is first attested in 1884, and has become by far the most common form.

In Norwegian, ørten is used in a similar way, playing on the numbers from tretten (13) to nitten (19), but often signifying a much larger number.

Similarly, though with a larger base, Portuguese has milhentos, which is derived from the words mil(har) (1000) and the suffix -entos, present in words like trezentos (300) or quinhentos (500), roughly meaning "hundred".

Spanish uses tropecientos/tropecientas in Spain and chorrocientos/chorrocientas in El Salvador and Mexico referring to a high number in a colloquial way. Cientos means "hundreds".

== Zillion ==
Words with the suffix -illion (e.g., zillion, gazillion, bazillion, jillion, bajillion, squillion, and others) are often used as informal names for unspecified large numbers by analogy to names of large numbers such as million (10^{6}), billion (10^{9}) and trillion (10^{12}). In Estonian, the compound word mustmiljon ("black million") is used to mean an unfathomably large number. In Hungarian, csilliárd is used in the same "indefinitely large number" sense as "zillion" in English, and is thought to be a humorous portmanteau of the words csillag ("star", referring to the vast number of stars) and milliárd ("billion", cf. long scale).

These words are intended to denote a number that is large enough to be unfathomable and are typically used as hyperbole or for comic effect. They have no precise value or order. They form ordinals and fractions with the usual suffix -th, e.g. "I asked her for the jillionth time", or are used with the suffix "-aire" to describe a wealthy person.

== Sagan ==
A sagan or sagan unit is a facetious name for a very large number inspired by Carl Sagan's association with the phrase "billions and billions".

== Specific values used as indefinite ==
In context, a specific numeric value may be used to mean an unspecific quantity.

Some words that have a precise numerical definition can be used indefinitely. These include couple (2), dozen (12), score (20), and myriad (10,000).

When a quantity word is prefixed with an indefinite article then it is sometimes intended or interpreted to be indefinite. For example, "one million" is clearly definite, but "a million" could be used to mean either a definite (she has a million followers now) or an indefinite value (she signed what felt like a million papers).

The title The Book of One Thousand and One Nights implies a large number of nights. Many book titles use this convention as well, such as 1,001 Uses for ....

In Basque, bost, "5", also means "a lot". Similarly, hamaika, "11", also means "a lot".

In Chinese, 十萬八千里; 十万八千里; shí wàn bā qiān lǐ, 108,000 li, means a great distance.

In Danish, hundrede og sytten ("a hundred and seventeen") can mean any arbitrary number.

In French, 36 and 36,000 are occasionally used as a synonym for "very many".

In Hebrew and other Middle Eastern traditions, the number 40 is used to express a large but unspecific number, as in the Hebrew Bible's "forty days and forty nights", Ali Baba and the Forty Thieves, and the Forty Martyrs of Sebaste. This usage is sometimes found in English as well (for example, "forty winks").

In Hungarian there are several expressions meaning "very many". A traditional expression is mint égen a csillag ("as many as the stars" in the sky). Sometimes specific numbers (e.g., 36,000 or 60,000) are used like in Danish or in French. Kismillió ("little million") is somewhat old, but a few decades ago it was still in use. From the end of the 20th century csillió began to spread. Csillió is a new word: it may be the result of combining the words csillag (star), and millió (million). Its enhanced version is csilliárd combining csillag and milliárd (billion).

In Irish, 100,000 (céad míle) is used, as in the phrase céad míle fáilte, "a hundred thousand welcomes" or Gabriel Rosenstock's poetic phrase Irish: mo chéad míle grá ("my hundred thousand loves").

In Japanese, 八千, 8000, is used: 八千草 (lit. 8,000 herbs) means a variety of herbs and 八千代 (lit. 8,000 generations) means eternity.

In Latin, sescenti (600) was used to mean a very large number, perhaps from the size of a Roman cohort. The modern word million derives from an Italian augmentative of the Latin word for thousand, mille.

In Polish, tysiąc pięćset sto dziewięćset ("one thousand five hundred one hundred nine hundred") is used, to refer to an indefinitely large number.

In Scottish Gaelic, 100,000 (ceud mìle) is used to mean a great number, as in the phrase ceud mìle fàilte, "a hundred thousand welcomes."

In Swedish, femtioelva or sjuttioelva is used (lit. "fifty-eleven" and "seventy-eleven", although never actually intended to refer to the numbers 61 and 81).

In Thai, ร้อยแปด (roi paed) means both 108 and miscellaneous, various, plentiful.

In Welsh, cant a mil, literally "a hundred and thousand", is used to mean a large number in a similar way to English "a hundred and one". It is used in phrases such as cant a mil o bethau i'w wneud "a hundred and one things to do" i.e. "many, many things to do".

The number 10,000 is used to express an even larger approximate number, as in Hebrew רבבה r^{e}vâvâh, rendered into Greek as μυριάδες, and to English myriad. Similar usage is found in the East Asian 萬 or 万 (lit. 10,000; pinyin: wàn), and the South Asian lakh (lit. 100,000).

== See also ==
- Infinity – Mathematical concept
- It's Over 9000! – Internet meme stemming from a quote in Dragon Ball Z
- List of unusual units of measurement – Units that are not part of a coherent system
- List of humorous units of measurement – Unconventional units of measurement intended as humor
- Large numbers – Numbers significantly larger than those used regularly
- Names of large numbers
- Unobtainium – Rare or fictional material
- Not a number – Value for unrepresentable data
