= Geneviève Guitel =

French mathematician (1895–1982)

- Born: 24 May 1895; Marly-le-Roi, France
- Died: 30 July 1982 (aged 87); Neuilly-sur-Seine, France
- Education: University of Paris
- Known for: Coining the terms long scale and short scale
- Scientific career
- Fields: Mathematics; History of mathematics
- Workplaces: Lycée Molière; CNRS
- Thesis: Familles de tétraèdres et figures apparentées. Analyse graphique des démonstrations (1953)

Geneviève Guitel (24 May 1895 – 30 July 1982) was a French mathematician. Post retirement, she had a second career as a historian of mathematics. She is noted for her work on the history of numeral systems. While working as a teacher in a Paris lycée, she undertook independent research into algebraic geometry, specifically trihedrons and tetrahedrons, and explored polygons and number theory. She is remembered for introducing the terms long and short scales to refer to two of the main numbering systems used around the world.

== Life ==
=== Early life and education ===
Geneviève Guitel was born in Marly-le-Roi on 24 May 1895. She was a niece of French historian Charles Bémont. She studied at the Faculty of Science at the University of Rennes, and in 1920 placed first in a women's mathematics competitive examination, the agrégation.

=== Career in mathematics ===
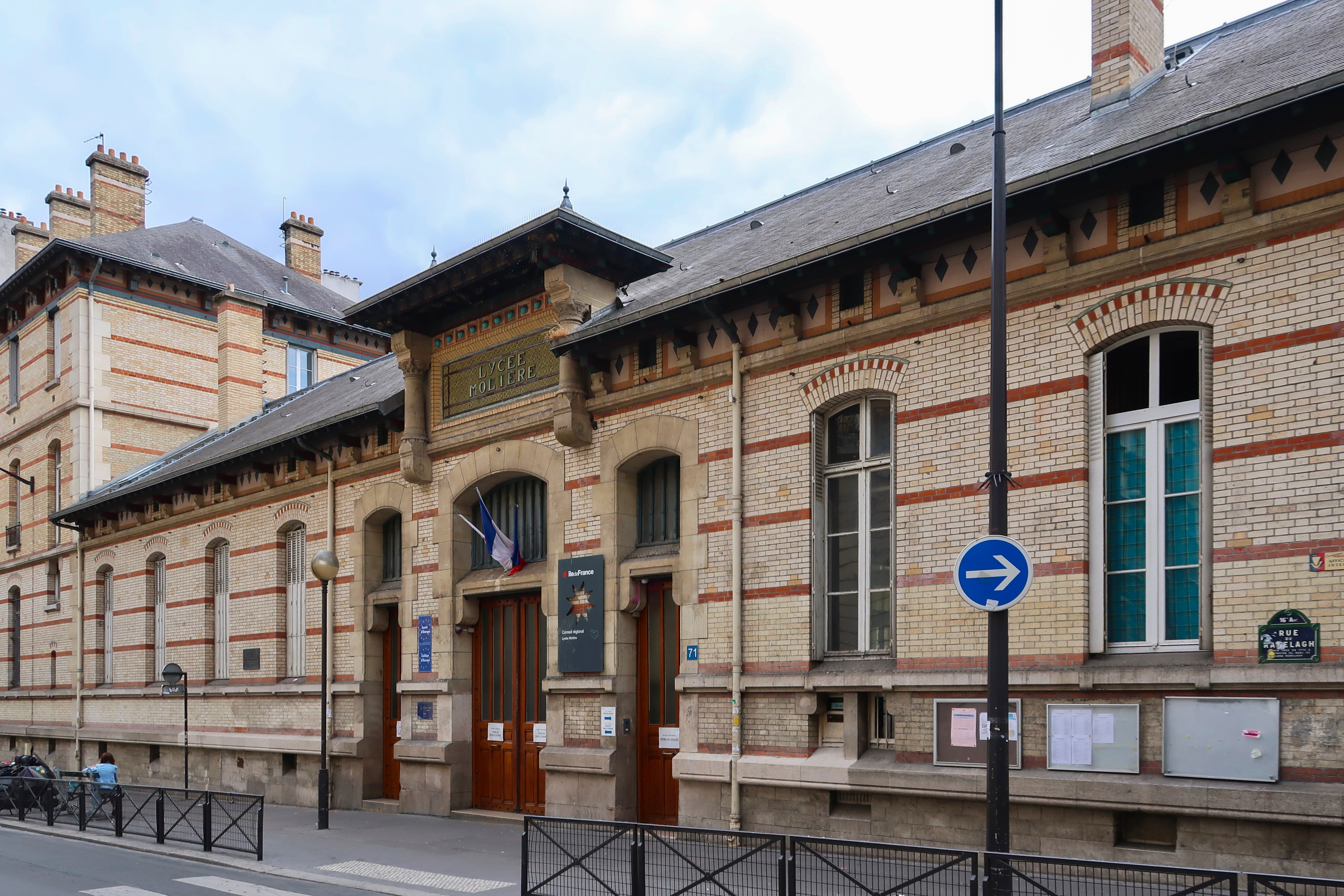
Lycée Molière, 71 rue du Ranelagh, Paris

Guitel was appointed as mathematics teacher in 1920 working first in Rennes, then Neuilly, before moving to teach at the Lycée Molière, a secondary school in Paris in 1936, eventually becoming a professor there. Whilst working there, Guitel undertook independent research. She studied algebraic geometry, specifically trihedrons and tetrahedrons, as well as exploring polygons and number theory. She published mathematical papers between 1943–1979.

In 1953, Guitel defended her state doctoral thesis on the metric study of tetrahedron families.

=== Career in history of mathematics ===
Guitel retired from the Lycée Molière in 1960 but continued her research through a contract at the French National Centre for Scientific Research (CNRS) exploring the history of numeral systems. This research was supported by the French historian and economist Charles Morazé, who Guitel had first met in 1949. She became close to the Morazé family whilst working in collaboration with Charles and historian Fernand Braudel. The men were co-founders of the Sixième section at the École pratique des hautes études (EPHE). She had known Braudel since the 1930s when she was working at the Lycée Molière, her uncle Charles Bémont having been one of his mentors. Guitel was part of Morazé’s research seminars at the Sixth Section until 1975, researching and publishing a number of articles on the history of mathematics in the journal Les Annales.

In 1975, she published a book Histoire comparée des numérations écrites, (Comparative History of Written Number Systems) where on p. 51–52 and in the chapter "Les grands nombres en numération parlée", p. 566–574, (English: The large numbers in oral numeration) she first recorded use of the terms long and short scales (échelle longue and échelle courte). Afterwards, she resigned from her research fellowship the same year, aged 80.

== Honors and awards ==
In 1955, she was awarded the French Academy of Sciences' Gegner prize for her doctoral thesis. She was only the second woman to be awarded the prize, the first female recipient was Marie Curie.

In 2026, Guitel was announced as one of 72 historical women in STEM whose names have been proposed to be added to the 72 men already celebrated on the Eiffel Tower. The plan was announced by the Mayor of Paris, Anne Hidalgo following the recommendations of a committee led by Isabelle Vauglin of Femmes et Sciences and Jean-François Martins, representing the operating company which runs the Eiffel Tower.

== Archive ==
Guitel made the Morazé family her sole legatees and left them her papers, which were later donated to the library of the University of Technology of Compiègne following Charles Morazé's death, along with his archives.

== Book ==
- Guitel, Geneviève (1975). Histoire comparée des numérations écrites (in French). Paris: Éd. Flammarion. ISBN 9782082111041.
