= Yoruba numerals =

Numerals in Yorùbá Language

According to Lounge, the Yoruba language has a rather elaborate vigesimal (base-20) numeral system that involves addition, subtraction and multiplication.

The base of the counting system is ogún 'twenty' (or 'score'). There are words for each of the decades; units in 1–4 are created by adding to these, while units in 5–9 are created by subtracting from the next decade. The odd decades are created by subtracting ten from the next even decade, as in Danish. Multiples are also very important in the numerical system for example the number 60 is ọgọ́ta which literally means three twenties (ogún = 20, ẹ̀ta = 3).

Up to 30, Yoruba has distinct forms of the numerals for counting objects, which derive from counting cowries.

	Numeral	Objects*	Tens**			Fives and tens			Hundred			Hundreds			Thousands			Myriads		
1	ení, ọ̀kan	oókàn	11	ọ̀kanlá, oókànlá	10+1	25	ẹ̀ẹ́dọ́gbọ̀n	30−5	110	àádọ́fà	20×6−10	210	ẹ̀wálélúɡba	200+10	1400	egbèje	200×7	8,000	ẹgbàarin	2000×4
2	èjì	eéjì	12	èjìlá, eéjìlá	10+2	30	ọgbọ̀n, ọɡbọ̀n ǒ	–	120	ọ(gọ́)fà	20×6	300	ọ̀ọ́dúrún, ọ̀ọ́dúnrún	400−100	1600	ẹgbẹ̀jọ	200×8	9,000	ẹ̀ẹ́dẹ́ɡbàarùn-ún	2000×5−1000
3	ẹ̀ta	ẹẹ́ta	13	ẹ̀tàlá, ẹẹ́tàlá	10+3	35	aárùn-ún-dínlógójì	20×2−5	130	àádóje	20×7−10	400	irinwó	—	1800	ẹgbẹ̀sán	200×9	10,000	ẹgbàarùn-ún	2000×5
4	ẹ̀rin	ẹẹ́rin	14	ẹ̀rìnlá, ẹẹ́rìnlá	10+4	40	ogójì › ojì	20×2	140	o(gó)je	20×7	500	ọ̀ọ́dẹ́gbẹ̀ta › ẹ̀ẹ́dẹ́gbẹ̀ta	200×3−100	2,000	ẹgbẹ̀wá ~ ẹgbàá	200×10	16,000	ẹgbàajọ	2000×8
5	àrún	aárùn-ún	15	ẹ̀ẹ́dógún***	20−5	50	àádọ́ta	20×3−10	150	àádọ́jọ	20×8−10	600	ẹgbẹ̀ta	200×3	2,200	ẹgbọ̀kànlá	200×11	20,000	ẹgbàawàá; ọ̀kẹ́ kan	2000×10; 1 bag
6	ẹ̀fà	ẹẹ́fà	16	ẹ̀rìndínlógún, ẹẹ́rìndínlógún	20−4	60	ọgọ́ta › ọta	20×3	160	ọ(gọ́)jọ	20×8	700	ọ̀ọ́dẹ́gbẹ̀rin › ẹ̀ẹ́dẹ́gbẹ̀rin	200×4−100	3,000	ẹgbẹ̀ẹ́dógún; ẹ̀ẹ́dẹ́gbàajì	200×15; 2000x2-1000	100,000	ọ̀kẹ́ márùn-ún	5 bags
7	èje	eéje	17	ẹ̀tàdínlógún, ẹẹ́tàdínlógún	20−3	70	àádọ́rin	20×4−10	170	àádọ́sàn-án	20×9−10	800	ẹgbẹ̀rin	200×4	4,000	ẹgbàajì	2000×2	1,000,000	àádọ́ta ọkẹ́; ẹgbẹẹgbẹ̀rún	50 bags; 1000×1000
8	ẹ̀jọ	ẹẹ́jọ	18	èjìdínlógún, eéjìdínlógún	20−2	80	ọgọ́rin › ọrin	20×4	180	ọ(gọ́)sàn-án	20×9	900	ẹ̀ẹ́dẹ́gbẹ̀rún	200×5−100	5,000	ẹgbẹ̀ẹ́dọ́gbọ̀n; ẹ̀ẹ́dẹ́gbàata	200×25; 2000x3-1000	2,000,000	ọgọ́rùn-ún ọ̀kẹ́, ọrún ọ̀kẹ́	100 bags
9	ẹ̀sán	ẹẹ́sàn-án	19	ọ̀kàndínlógún, oókàndínlógún	20−1	90	àádọ́rùn-ún	20×5−10	190	ẹ̀wádínlúɡba, àádọ́wàá	200−10	1000	ẹgbẹ̀rún	200×5	6,000	ẹgbàata	2000×3	3,000,000	àádọ́jọ ọ̀kẹ́	150 bags
10	ẹ̀wá	ẹẹ́wàá	20	ogún, okòó	—	100	ọgọ́rùn-ún › ọrún	20×5	200	igba, igbéo	20x10	1200	ẹgbẹ̀fà	200×6	7,000	ẹ̀ẹ́dẹ́ɡbàarin	2000×4−1000	4,000,000	igba ọ̀kẹ́	200 bags

* Oókàn is a contraction of owó ọ̀kan 'one cowrie'; 2–10, 20, and 30 are analogous.
** Lá is a contraction of lé ẹ̀wá 'and ten'.
*** Ẹ̀ẹ́dógún is a contraction of aárùn-ún-dí(n)(l)ógún 'five from twenty'.
*** igbéo is a contraction of igba owó 'a heap of cowries'.

Ogún is the basic word for twenty, okòó the word when counting objects. For thirty, the forms are ọgbọ̀n and ọɡbọ̀n ǒ. Units apart from the fives are generally transparent: oókànlélógún 'twenty-one', eéjìdínlọ́ɡbọ̀n 'twenty-eight', etc. There are also more recent decimal forms for the thousands: 2,000 ẹgbẹ̀rún méjì 'thousand twice', 3,000 ẹgbẹ̀rún mẹ́ta 'thousand thrice', etc., as well as additive forms for the fives, due to the influence of English. Numbers higher than 20,000 also tend to be transparent: 40,000 is ẹgbàawàá lọ́nà méjì '20,000 two times'.
