= Myriad =

Order of magnitude name for 10,000

In the context of numeric naming systems for powers of ten, myriad is the quantity ten thousand (10,000). Idiomatically, in English, myriad is an adjective used to mean that a group of things has indefinitely large quantity.

Myriad derives from the ancient Greek for ten thousand (μυριάς, murias) and is used with this meaning in literal translations from Greek, Latin or Sinospheric languages (Chinese, Japanese, Korean, and Vietnamese), and in reference to ancient Greek numerals.

The term myriad is also used in the form "a myriad" for a 100 km × 100 km square (10,000 km2) the grid size of the British Ordnance Survey National Grid and the US Military Grid Reference System. It contains 100 hectads.

== History ==
The Aegean numerals of the Minoan and Mycenaean civilizations included a symbol composed of a circle with four dashes 𐄫 to denote tens of thousands.

In classical Greek numerals, myriad was written as a capital mu: Μ. To distinguish this numeral from letters, it was sometimes given an overbar: M̅. Multiples were written above this sign. For example $\stackrel{\delta\phi\pi\beta}{\Mu}$ is 4,582×10,000 or 45,820,000.

The etymology of myriad is uncertain. It has been variously connected to PIE *meu- ("damp") in reference to the waves of the sea and to Greek myrmex (μύρμηξ, "ant") in reference to their swarms.

In his Sand Reckoner, Archimedes used "myriad myriad" (M̅M̅, one hundred million) as the basis for a numeration system of large powers of ten, which he used to count grains of sand.

== In English ==
Myriad may be used either as an adjective (there are myriad people outside) or as a noun (there is a myriad of people outside), but there are small differences. The former might imply that it is a diverse group of people whereas the latter usually does not.

Despite its usual meaning (a large, unspecified quantity), myriad is sometimes used in English to mean ten thousand although usually restricted to translation from other languages like ancient Greek and Chinese where quantities are grouped by 10,000. Such use permits the translator to remain closer to the original text and avoid unwieldy mentions of "tens of thousands". For example, "the original number of the crews supplied by the several nations I find to have been twenty-four myriads" and "What is the distance between one bridge and another? Twelve myriads of parasangs".

== In European languages ==
Most European languages include a variation of myriad with a similar meaning to the English word.

Additionally, the prefix myria- indicating multiplication times ten thousand (×10^{4}), was part of the original metric system adopted by France in 1795. Although it was not retained after the 11th CGPM conference in 1960, myriameter is sometimes still encountered as a translation of the Scandinavian mile (Swedish & Norwegian: mil) of 10 kilometers (6.21 mi), or in some classifications of wavelengths as the adjective myriametric. The myriagramme (10 kg) was a French approximation of the avoirdupois quartier of 25 pounds (11 kg) and the myriaton appears in Isaac Asimov's Foundation novel trilogy.

In modern Greek, the word "myriad" is rarely used to denote 10,000, but a million is ekatommyrio (εκατομμύριο, lit. 'hundred myriad') and a thousand million is disekatommyrio (δισεκατομμύριο, lit. 'twice hundred myriad').

== In East Asian languages ==
In East Asia, the traditional numeral systems of China, Korea, and Japan are all decimal-based but grouped into ten thousands rather than thousands. The character for myriad is 萬 in traditional script and 万 in simplified form in both mainland China and Japanese; its pronunciation varies between languages (Mandarin: wàn, Hakka: wan^{5}, Minnan: bān, Cantonese: maan^{6}, Japanese and Korean: man, Vietnamese: vạn, Thai: หมื่น muen and Khmer: ម៉ឺន meun).

Because of this grouping into fours, higher orders of numbers are provided by the powers of 10,000 rather than 1,000: In China, 10,000^{2} was 萬萬 in ancient texts but is now called 億 and sometimes written as 1,0000,0000; 10,000^{3} is 1,0000,0000,0000 or 兆; 10,000^{4} is 1,0000,0000,0000,0000 or 京; and so on. Conversely, Chinese, Japanese, and Korean generally do not have native words for powers of one thousand: what is called "one million" in English is "100萬" (100 myriad) in the Sinosphere, and "one billion" in English is "十億" (ten myllion) or "十萬萬" (ten myriad myriad) in the Sinosphere. Unusually, Vietnam employs its former translation of 兆, một triệu, to mean 1,000,000 rather than the Chinese figure. Similarly, the Chinese government has adapted the word 兆 to mean the scientific prefix mega-, but transliterations are used instead for giga-, tera-, and other larger prefixes. This has caused confusion in areas closely related to China such as Hong Kong and Macau, where 兆 is still largely used to mean 10,000^{3}.

萬 and 万 are also frequently employed colloquially in expressions, clichés, and chengyu (idioms) in the senses of "vast", "numerous", "numberless", and "infinite". A skeleton key is a 万能钥匙 ("myriad-use key"), the emperor was the "lord of myriad chariots" (萬乘之主), the Great Wall is called 万里长城 ("Myriad-mile Long Wall"), Zhu Xi's statement 月映万川 ("the moon reflects in myriad rivers") had the sense of supporting greater empiricism in Chinese philosophy, and Ha Qiongwen's popular 1959 propaganda poster 毛主席万岁, meaning "Long live Chairman Mao", literally reads as "[May] Chairman Mao [live to be] 10,000 years old". Its literary use may thus mean something huge and plentiful.

== In Indic languages ==
In Sanskrit, the word for ten thousand is ayuta (Sanskrit: अयुत, romanized: ayuta), which Sanskrit–English dictionaries commonly translate as "a myriad". It is analysed as the negative prefix a- joined to yuta ("joined"), that is, "unjoined" or "unbounded". The word is recorded in the Rigveda and the Atharvaveda, and as the first element of a compound it could also serve as a term of praise.

Ayuta is one of the named powers of ten in the number lists preserved in the Yajurveda. In these lists each term is ten times the one before it: eka (1), daśa (10), śata (100), sahasra (1,000), ayuta (10,000), niyuta (100,000), prayuta (1,000,000), and so on up to parārdha (10^{12}). Versions of the list occur in several Vedic collections, including the Vājasaneyī Saṃhitā of the Shukla Yajurveda and the Taittirīya Saṃhitā, with slight variations between them. The historian of mathematics Kim Plofker observes that this vocabulary, which extends to at least 10^{12}, goes well beyond the number words known from other ancient civilizations, which reach only into the thousands or tens of thousands.

The value of ayuta was not fixed in all later traditions. According to Franklin Edgerton, the word is defined only as 10,000 in Sanskrit proper, but in Buddhist Hybrid Sanskrit texts it is more often defined as 100 koṭis (10^{9}), as in the Lalitavistara Sūtra. The Mahāvyutpatti, a Sanskrit–Tibetan Buddhist glossary, records both values, and in the Sukhāvatīvyūha the term stands for a far larger number.

In the modern Indo-Aryan languages, ayuta survives as a learned word borrowed from Sanskrit; for example, a Marathi dictionary lists अयुत as a Sanskrit-derived term meaning ten thousand or a myriad. In ordinary counting, ten thousand is expressed as a multiple of a thousand, as in Hindi दस हज़ार (das hazār, "ten thousand"). The units that are distinctive of the Indian numbering system begin one step higher, with the lakh (100,000) and the crore (10,000,000), and in Indian English amounts below one lakh are counted in thousands. The word was also borrowed outside the Indo-Aryan family: the Dravidian language Tamil has அயுதம் (ayutam), which the Tamil Lexicon glosses as ten thousand using the ordinary Tamil compound பதினாயிரம் (patiṉāyiram).

== In Old Turkic ==
A similar term is the Old Turkic word tümän, whose variant forms remain in use for "ten thousand" among modern Mongolian, Turkish. According to Sir Gerard Clauson (1891–1974), it was likely borrowed from Tokharian tmān, which may have been borrowed in turn from Old Chinese tman 萬 > wan.

== In Hebrew ==
In Hebrew the word רבבה (pronounced "revava") means 10,000, and is the highest number represented in Hebrew. Its sources go back to biblical times.

== See also ==
The dictionary definition of myriad at Wiktionary

- -yllion – Mathematical notation
- Indian numbering system – Indian convention of naming large numbers
- Long and short scale – Different meanings for numbers
- Names of large numbers
