= Names of large numbers =

Depending on context (e.g., language, culture, region), some large numbers have names that allow for describing large quantities in a textual, not mathematical, form. For very large values, the text is generally shorter than a decimal numeric representation, although longer than scientific notation.

Two naming scales for large numbers have been used in English and other European languages since the early modern era: the long and short scales. Most English variants use the short scale today, but the long scale remains dominant in many non-English-speaking areas, including continental Europe and Spanish-speaking countries in the Americas. These naming procedures are based on taking the number n occurring in 10^{3n+3} (short scale) or 10^{6n} (long scale) and concatenating Latin roots for its units, tens, and hundreds place, together with the suffix -illion.

Names of numbers above a trillion are rarely used in practice; such large numbers have practical usage primarily in the scientific domain, where powers of ten are expressed as 10 with a numeric superscript, and in the case of hyperinflation. However, these somewhat rare names are considered acceptable for approximate statements. For example, the statement "There are approximately 7.1 octillion atoms in an adult human body" is understood to be in short scale of the table below (and is only accurate if referring to short scale rather than long scale).

The Indian numbering system uses the named numbers common between the long and short scales up to ten thousand. For larger values, it includes named numbers at each multiple of 100, including lakh (10^{5}) and crore (10^{7}).

English also has words, such as zillion, that are used informally to mean large but unspecified amounts.

== Standard dictionary numbers ==
In the following table, "SS" is used for short scale, and "LS" for "long scale".

x	Name (SS/LS, LS)	SS (10^{3x+3})	LS (10^{6x}, 10^{6x+3})	Appearance in different dictionaries								
x	Name (SS/LS, LS)	SS (10^{3x+3})	LS (10^{6x}, 10^{6x+3})	AHD4	CED	COD	MW	OED	RHD2	SOED3	W3	HM
1	million	10^{6}	10^{6}	✓	✓	✓	✓	✓	✓	✓	✓	✓
	milliard		10^{9}	✓	✓	✓	✓	✓	✓			✓
2	billion	10^{9}	10^{12}	✓	✓	✓	✓	✓	✓	✓	✓	✓
3	trillion	10^{12}	10^{18}	✓	✓	✓	✓	✓	✓	✓	✓	✓
4	quadrillion	10^{15}	10^{24}	✓	✓	✓	✓	✓	✓	✓	✓	✓
5	quintillion	10^{18}	10^{30}	✓	✓	✓	✓	✓	✓	✓	✓	✓
6	sextillion	10^{21}	10^{36}	✓	✓		✓	✓	✓	✓	✓	✓
7	septillion	10^{24}	10^{42}	✓	✓		✓	✓	✓	✓	✓	✓
8	octillion	10^{27}	10^{48}	✓	✓		✓	✓	✓	✓	✓	✓
9	nonillion	10^{30}	10^{54}	✓	✓		✓	✓	✓	✓	✓	✓
10	decillion	10^{33}	10^{60}	✓	✓		✓	✓	✓	✓	✓	✓
11	undecillion	10^{36}	10^{66}	✓	✓		✓		✓		✓	✓
12	duodecillion	10^{39}	10^{72}	✓	✓	✓	✓		✓		✓	✓
13	tredecillion	10^{42}	10^{78}	✓	✓		✓		✓		✓	✓
14	quattuordecillion	10^{45}	10^{84}	✓	✓		✓		✓		✓	✓
15	quindecillion	10^{48}	10^{90}	✓	✓		✓		✓		✓	✓
16	sexdecillion	10^{51}	10^{96}	✓	✓		✓		✓		✓	✓
17	septendecillion	10^{54}	10^{102}	✓	✓		✓		✓		✓	✓
18	octodecillion	10^{57}	10^{108}	✓	✓		✓		✓		✓	✓
19	novemdecillion	10^{60}	10^{114}	✓	✓		✓		✓		✓	✓
20	vigintillion	10^{63}	10^{120}	✓	✓		✓	✓	✓	✓	✓	✓
30	trigintillion	10^{93}	10^{180}		✓	✓	✓	✓	✓	✓	✓	✓
40	quadragintillion	10^{123}	10^{240}	✓	✓		✓	✓	✓	✓	✓	✓
100	centillion	10^{303}	10^{600}	✓	✓		✓	✓	✓			✓

Usage:

- Short scale: US, English Canada, modern British, Australia, and Eastern Europe
- Long scale: French Canada, obsolete British, Western & Central Europe

Obsolete terms such as "billiard" and "trilliard" are listed below under "Extensions of the standard dictionary numbers".

Apart from million, the words in this list ending with -illion are all derived by adding prefixes (bi-, tri-, etc., derived from Latin) to the stem -illion. Centillion appears to be the highest name ending in -illion that is included in these dictionaries. Trigintillion, often cited as a word in discussions of names of large numbers, is not included in any of them, nor are any of the names that can easily be created by extending the naming pattern (unvigintillion, duovigintillion, duoquinquagintillion, etc.).

Name	Value	Authorities								
Name	Value	AHD4	CED	COD	MW	OED	RHD2	SOED3	W3	HM
googol	10^{100}	✓	✓	✓	✓	✓	✓	✓	✓	✓
googolplex	10^{googol} (10^{10^{100}})	✓	✓	✓	✓	✓	✓	✓	✓	✓

All of the dictionaries included googol and googolplex, generally crediting it to the Kasner and Newman book and to Kasner's nephew (see below). None include any higher names in the googol family (googolduplex, etc.). The Oxford English Dictionary comments that googol and googolplex are "not in formal mathematical use".

== Usage of names of large numbers ==
Some names of large numbers, such as million, billion, and trillion, have real referents in human experience, and are encountered in many contexts, particularly in finance and economics. At times, the names of large numbers have been forced into common usage as a result of hyperinflation. The highest numerical value banknote ever printed was a note for 1 sextillion pengő (10^{21} or 1 milliárd bilpengő as printed) printed in Hungary in 1946. In 2009, Zimbabwe printed a 100 trillion (10^{14}) Zimbabwean dollar note, which at the time of printing was worth about US$30. In global economics, the name of a significantly larger number was used in 2024, when the Russian news outlet RBK stated that the sum of legal claims against Google in Russia totalled 2 undecillion (2×10^{36}) rubles, or US$20 decillion (US $2×10^{34}), a value worth more than all financial assets in the world combined. A Kremlin spokesperson, Dmitry Peskov, stated that this value was symbolic.

Names of larger numbers, however, have a tenuous, artificial existence, rarely found outside definitions, lists, and discussions of how large numbers are named. Even well-established names like sextillion are rarely used, since in the context of science, including astronomy, where such large numbers often occur, they are nearly always written using scientific notation. In this notation, powers of ten are expressed as 10 with a numeric superscript, e.g. "The X-ray emission of the radio galaxy is 1.3×10^{45} joules." When a number such as 10^{45} needs to be referred to in words, it is simply read out as "ten to the forty-fifth" or "ten to the forty-five". This is easier to say and less ambiguous than "quattuordecillion", which means something different in the long scale and the short scale.

When a number represents a quantity rather than a count, SI prefixes can be used—thus "femtosecond", not "one quadrillionth of a second"—although often powers of ten are used instead of some of the very high and very low prefixes. In some cases, specialized units are used, such as the astronomer's parsec and light year or the particle physicist's barn.

Large numbers have an intellectual fascination and are of mathematical interest, and giving them names is a way to conceptualize and understand them.

One of the earliest examples of this is The Sand Reckoner, in which Archimedes gave a system for naming large numbers. To do this, he called the numbers up to a myriad myriad (10^{8}) "first numbers" and called 10^{8} itself the "unit of the second numbers". Multiples of this unit then became the second numbers, up to this unit taken a myriad myriad times, 10^{8}·10^{8}=10^{16}. This became the "unit of the third numbers", whose multiples were the third numbers, and so on. Archimedes continued naming numbers in this way up to a myriad myriad times the unit of the 10^{8}-th numbers, i.e. $(10^8)^{(10^8)}=10^{8\cdot 10^8},$ and embedded this construction within another copy of itself to produce names for numbers up to $((10^8)^{(10^8)})^{(10^8)}=10^{8\cdot 10^{16}}.$ Archimedes then estimated the number of grains of sand that would be required to fill the known universe, and found that it was no more than "one thousand myriad of the eighth numbers" (10^{63}).

== Origins of the "standard dictionary numbers" ==
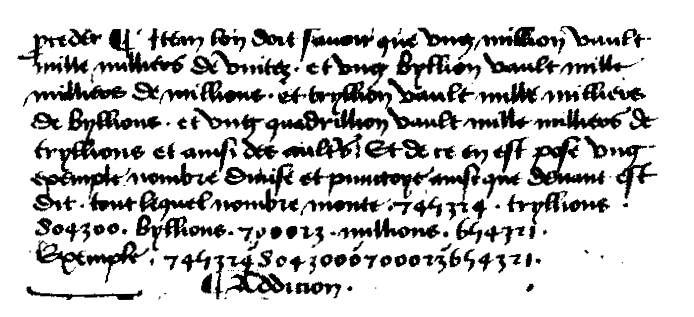

The words bymillion and trimillion were first recorded in 1475 in a manuscript of Jehan Adam. Subsequently, Nicolas Chuquet wrote a book Triparty en la science des nombres which was not published during Chuquet's lifetime. However, most of it was copied by Estienne de La Roche for a portion of his 1520 book, L'arismetique. Chuquet's book contains a passage in which he shows a large number marked off into groups of six digits, with the comment:

Ou qui veult le premier point peult signiffier million Le second point byllion Le tiers point tryllion Le quart quadrillion Le cinq^{e} quyllion Le six^{e} sixlion Le sept.^{e} septyllion Le huyt^{e} ottyllion Le neuf^{e} nonyllion et ainsi des ault'^{s} se plus oultre on vouloit preceder

(Or if you prefer the first mark can signify million, the second mark byllion, the third mark tryllion, the fourth quadrillion, the fifth quyillion, the sixth sixlion, the seventh septyllion, the eighth ottyllion, the ninth nonyllion and so on with others as far as you wish to go).

Adam and Chuquet used the long scale of powers of a million; that is, Adam's bymillion (Chuquet's byllion) denoted 10^{12}, and Adam's trimillion (Chuquet's tryllion) denoted 10^{18}.

== Googol family ==
The names googol and googolplex were invented by Edward Kasner's nephew Milton Sirotta and introduced in Kasner and Newman's 1940 book Mathematics and the Imagination in the following passage:

The name "googol" was invented by a child (Dr. Kasner's nine-year-old nephew) who was asked to think up a name for a very big number, namely 1 with one hundred zeroes after it. He was very certain that this number was not infinite, and therefore equally certain that it had to have a name. At the same time that he suggested "googol" he gave a name for a still larger number: "googolplex". A googolplex is much larger than a googol, but is still finite, as the inventor of the name was quick to point out. It was first suggested that a googolplex should be 1, followed by writing zeros until you got tired. This is a description of what would happen if one tried to write a googolplex, but different people get tired at different times and it would never do to have Carnera a better mathematician than Dr. Einstein, simply because he had more endurance. The googolplex is, then, a specific finite number, equal to 1 with a googol zeros after it.

Value	Name	Authority
10^{100}	googol	Kasner and Newman, dictionaries (see above)
10^{googol} = 10^{10^{100}}	googolplex	Kasner and Newman, dictionaries (see above)

John Horton Conway and Richard K. Guy have suggested that N-plex be used as a name for 10^{N}. This gives rise to the name googolplexplex for 10^{googolplex} = 10^{10^{10^{100}}}, which is unofficially known as a googolplexian (or googolduplex) by some googologists. Conway and Guy have proposed that N-minex be used as a name for 10^{−N}, giving rise to the name googolminex for the reciprocal of a googolplex, which is written as 10^{−(10^{100})}. None of these names are in wide use.

A googologist from Texas coined the terms giggol and giggolplex for tetrational numbers. Giggol is equal to ${10 \uparrow \uparrow 100}$, or 10 tetrated to 100 and Giggolplex is 10 tetrated to giggol or $10\uparrow\uparrow (10\uparrow\uparrow 100)$. If they are written in exponentiation, then they would be power towers of 100 and "a power tower of 100 tens" tens, respectively. They were coined by altering the vowel sound of "googol" and a different definition of "-plex": If $N = f(10, 10)$ or $f(10, 100)$, where $f$ is any googolocial function, then $N$-plex $= f(10, N)$

The names googol and googolplex inspired the name of the Internet company Google and its corporate headquarters, the Googleplex, respectively.

== Extensions of the standard dictionary numbers ==
This section illustrates several systems for naming large numbers, and shows how they can be extended past vigintillion.

Traditional British usage assigned new names for each power of one million (the long scale): 1,000,000 = 1 million; 1,000,000^{2} = 1 billion; 1,000,000^{3} = 1 trillion; and so on. It was adapted from French usage, and is similar to the system that was documented or invented by Chuquet.

Traditional American usage (which was also adapted from French usage but at a later date), Canadian, and modern British usage assign new names for each power of one thousand (the short scale). Thus, a billion is 1000 × 1000^{2} = 10^{9}; a trillion is 1000 × 1000^{3} = 10^{12}; and so forth. Due to its dominance in the financial world (along with the US dollar), this was adopted for official United Nations documents.

Traditional French usage has varied; in 1948, France, which had originally popularized the short scale worldwide, reverted to the long scale.

The term milliard is unambiguous and always means 10^{9}. It is seldom seen in American usage and rarely in British usage, but frequently in continental European usage. The term is sometimes attributed to French mathematician Jacques Peletier du Mans c. 1550 (for this reason, the long scale is also known as the Chuquet-Peletier system), but the Oxford English Dictionary states that the term derives from post-Classical Latin term milliartum, which became milliare and then milliart and finally our modern term.

Concerning names ending in -illiard for numbers 10^{6n+3}, milliard is certainly in widespread use in languages other than English, but the degree of actual use of the larger terms is questionable. The terms "milliardo" in Italian, "Milliarde" in German, "miljard" in Dutch, "milyar" in Turkish, and "миллиард", milliard (transliterated) in Russian, are standard usage when discussing financial topics.

The naming procedure for large numbers is based on taking the number n occurring in 10^{3n+3} (short scale) or 10^{6n} (long scale) and concatenating Latin roots for its units, tens, and hundreds place, together with the suffix -illion. If the final root is multisyllabic and ends in a vowel, that vowel is removed; for example, centi + illion = centillion, not centiillion. Monosyllabic final roots ending in vowels only occur when the naming system does not apply, for very small numbers (million, billion, and sextillion), so they do not have defined behavior. The number "0" is skipped, i.e. it produces the empty string - 103 results in the root for units 3 followed by the root for hundreds 1. In this way, numbers up to 10^{3·999+3} = 10^{3000} (short scale) or 10^{6·999} = 10^{5994} (long scale) may be named. The choice of roots and the concatenation procedure is that of the standard dictionary numbers if n is 9 or smaller. For larger n (between 10 and 999), prefixes can be constructed based on a system described by Conway and Guy. Today, sexdecillion and novemdecillion are standard dictionary numbers and, using the same reasoning as Conway and Guy did for the numbers up to nonillion, could probably be used to form acceptable prefixes. The Conway–Guy system for forming prefixes:

	Units	Tens	Hundreds
0			
1	Un	^{N}Deci	^{N}^{X}Centi
2	Duo	^{M}^{S}Viginti	^{N}Ducenti
3	Tre^{S}	^{N}^{S}Triginta	^{N}^{S}Trecenti
4	Quattuor	^{N}^{S}Quadraginta	^{N}^{S}Quadringenti
5	Quinqua^{3}	^{N}^{S}Quinquaginta	^{N}^{S}Quingenti
6	Se^{SX}	^{N}Sexaginta	^{N}Sescenti
7	Septe^{MN}	^{N}Septuaginta	^{N}Septingenti
8	Octo	^{M}^{X}Octoginta	^{M}^{X}Octingenti
9	Nove^{MN}	Nonaginta	Nongenti

1. When preceding a component prefixed with ^{S} or ^{X}, a component suffixed with ^{S} - "tre" - suffixes with an s ("tres") and a component suffixed with ^{SX} - "se" - suffixes to match the prefix ("ses" or "sex").
2. When preceding a component prefixed with ^{M} or ^{N}, a component suffixed with ^{MN} - "septe" and "nove" - suffixes to match the prefix ( "septem" and "novem" or "septen" and "noven").
3. Conway and Guy originally used "quinqua" but as a result of Miakinen's suggestion "quin" is mostly used.

The Conway–Guy system disagrees with some standard dictionary names, like "quindecillion", "sexdecillion", and "novemdecillion". Oliver Miakinen argued that since "quindecillion" is a widely accepted term, and the Latin for 15 is actually quindecim and not quinquadecim, the prefix "quinqua-" should be replaced with "quin-". This new prefix is more commonly used nowadays.

Since the system of using Latin prefixes will become ambiguous for numbers with exponents of a size which the Romans rarely counted to, like 10^{6,000,258}, Conway and Guy co-devised with Allan Wechsler the following set of consistent conventions that permit, in principle, the extension of this system indefinitely to provide English short-scale names for any integer whatsoever. The name of a number 10^{3n+3}, where n is greater than or equal to 1000, is formed by concatenating the names of the numbers of the form 10^{3m+3}, where m represents each group of comma-separated digits of n, with each but the last "-illion" trimmed to "-illi-", or, in the case of m = 0, either "-nilli-" or "-nillion". For example, 10^{3,000,012}, the 1,000,003rd "-illion" number, equals one "millinillitrillion"; 10^{33,002,010,111}, the 11,000,670,036th "-illion" number, equals one "undecillinilliseptuagintasescentillisestrigintillion"; and 10^{29,629,629,633}, the 9,876,543,210th "-illion" number, equals one "nonilliseseptuagintaoctingentillitresquadragintaquingentillideciducentillion".

The following table shows number names generated by the system described by Conway and Guy for the short and long scales. Note that since the scale begins at n=10, the short scale begins at 10^{33} and the long scale begins at 10^{60}; below that, one is supposed to consult the dictionary.

Base -illion (short scale)	Base -illion (long scale)	Value	US, Canada, and modern British (short scale)	Traditional British (long scale)	Traditional European (Peletier long scale)
1	1	10^{6}	million	million	million
2	1	10^{9}	billion	thousand million	milliard
3	2	10^{12}	trillion	billion	billion
4	2	10^{15}	quadrillion	thousand billion	billiard
5	3	10^{18}	quintillion	trillion	trillion
6	3	10^{21}	sextillion	thousand trillion	trilliard
7	4	10^{24}	septillion	quadrillion	quadrillion
8	4	10^{27}	octillion	thousand quadrillion	quadrilliard
9	5	10^{30}	nonillion	quintillion	quintillion
10	5	10^{33}	decillion	thousand quintillion	quintilliard
11	6	10^{36}	undecillion	sextillion	sextillion
12	6	10^{39}	duodecillion	thousand sextillion	sextilliard
13	7	10^{42}	tredecillion	septillion	septillion
14	7	10^{45}	quattuordecillion	thousand septillion	septilliard
15	8	10^{48}	quindecillion	octillion	octillion
16	8	10^{51}	sedecillion (Note: While, today, sexdecillion and novemdecillion are standard dictionary numbers, these numbers are called "sedecillion" and "novendecillion" respectively in the Conway and Guy system. The same applies to the long scale forms "sedecilliard" and "novendecilliard".)	thousand octillion	octilliard
17	9	10^{54}	septendecillion	nonillion	nonillion
18	9	10^{57}	octodecillion	thousand nonillion	nonilliard
19	10	10^{60}	novendecillion	decillion	decillion
20	10	10^{63}	vigintillion	thousand decillion	decilliard
21	11	10^{66}	unvigintillion	undecillion	undecillion
22	11	10^{69}	duovigintillion	thousand undecillion	undecilliard
23	12	10^{72}	tresvigintillion	duodecillion	duodecillion
24	12	10^{75}	quattuorvigintillion	thousand duodecillion	duodecilliard
25	13	10^{78}	quinvigintillion	tredecillion	tredecillion
26	13	10^{81}	sesvigintillion	thousand tredecillion	tredecilliard
27	14	10^{84}	septemvigintillion	quattuordecillion	quattuordecillion
28	14	10^{87}	octovigintillion	thousand quattuordecillion	quattuordecilliard
29	15	10^{90}	novemvigintillion	quindecillion	quindecillion
30	15	10^{93}	trigintillion	thousand quindecillion	quindecilliard
31	16	10^{96}	untrigintillion	sedecillion	sedecillion
32	16	10^{99}	duotrigintillion	thousand sedecillion	sedecilliard
33	17	10^{102}	trestrigintillion	septendecillion	septendecillion
34	17	10^{105}	quattuortrigintillion	thousand septendecillion	septendecilliard
35	18	10^{108}	quintrigintillion	octodecillion	octodecillion
36	18	10^{111}	sestrigintillion	thousand octodecillion	octodecilliard
37	19	10^{114}	septentrigintillion	novendecillion	novendecillion
38	19	10^{117}	octotrigintillion	thousand novendecillion	novendecilliard
39	20	10^{120}	noventrigintillion	vigintillion	vigintillion
40	20	10^{123}	quadragintillion	thousand vigintillion	vigintilliard
50	25	10^{153}	quinquagintillion	thousand quinvigintillion	quinvigintilliard
60	30	10^{183}	sexagintillion	thousand trigintillion	trigintilliard
70	35	10^{213}	septuagintillion	thousand quintrigintillion	quintrigintilliard
80	40	10^{243}	octogintillion	thousand quadragintillion	quadragintilliard
90	45	10^{273}	nonagintillion	thousand quinquadragintillion	quinquadragintilliard
100	50	10^{303}	centillion	thousand quinquagintillion	quinquagintilliard
101	51	10^{306}	uncentillion	unquinquagintillion	unquinquagintillion
110	55	10^{333}	decicentillion	thousand quinquinquagintillion	quinquinquagintilliard
111	56	10^{336}	undecicentillion	sesquinquagintillion	sesquinquagintillion
120	60	10^{363}	viginticentillion	thousand sexagintillion	sexagintilliard
121	61	10^{366}	unviginticentillion	unsexagintillion	unsexagintillion
130	65	10^{393}	trigintacentillion	thousand quinsexagintillion	quinsexagintilliard
140	70	10^{423}	quadragintacentillion	thousand septuagintillion	septuagintilliard
150	75	10^{453}	quinquagintacentillion	thousand quinseptuagintillion	quinseptuagintilliard
160	80	10^{483}	sexagintacentillion	thousand octogintillion	octogintilliard
170	85	10^{513}	septuagintacentillion	thousand quinoctogintillion	quinoctogintilliard
180	90	10^{543}	octogintacentillion	thousand nonagintillion	nonagintilliard
190	95	10^{573}	nonagintacentillion	thousand quinnonagintillion	quinnonagintilliard
200	100	10^{603}	ducentillion	thousand centillion	centilliard
300	150	10^{903}	trecentillion	thousand quinquagintacentillion	quinquagintacentilliard
400	200	10^{1203}	quadringentillion	thousand ducentillion	ducentilliard
500	250	10^{1503}	quingentillion	thousand quinquagintaducentillion	quinquagintaducentilliard
600	300	10^{1803}	sescentillion	thousand trecentillion	trecentilliard
700	350	10^{2103}	septingentillion	thousand quinquagintatrecentillion	quinquagintatrecentilliard
800	400	10^{2403}	octingentillion	thousand quadringentillion	quadringentilliard
900	450	10^{2703}	nongentillion	thousand quinquagintaquadringentillion	quinquagintaquadringentilliard
1000	500	10^{3003}	millinillion	thousand quingentillion	quingentilliard
1000000	500000	10^{3000003}	millinillinillion	thousand quingentillinillion	quingentillinilliard

== Unit prefixes ==
The following table lists the unit prefixes for powers of 1000 and 1024 according to the International System of Quantities (ISQ).

Decimal			Binary		
Value	SI		Value	IEC	
1000 (10^{3})	k	kilo	1024 (2^{10})	Ki	kibi
1000^{2} (10^{6})	M	mega	1024^{2} (2^{20})	Mi	mebi
1000^{3} (10^{9})	G	giga	1024^{3} (2^{30})	Gi	gibi
1000^{4} (10^{12})	T	tera	1024^{4} (2^{40})	Ti	tebi
1000^{5} (10^{15})	P	peta	1024^{5} (2^{50})	Pi	pebi
1000^{6} (10^{18})	E	exa	1024^{6} (2^{60})	Ei	exbi
1000^{7} (10^{21})	Z	zetta	1024^{7} (2^{70})	Zi	zebi
1000^{8} (10^{24})	Y	yotta	1024^{8} (2^{80})	Yi	yobi
1000^{9} (10^{27})	R	ronna	1024^{9} (2^{90})	Ri	robi
1000^{10} (10^{30})	Q	quetta	1024^{10} (2^{100})	Qi	quebi

== Other named large numbers used in mathematics, physics and chemistry ==
- Avogadro number – Number of particles in one mole, 6.02214076×10^{23}
- Eddington number – Number of protons in the observable universe, about 1.57×10^{79}
- Shannon number – Lower bound on the game-tree complexity of chess, about 10^{120}
- Skewes's number – Large upper bound related to the prime-counting function, about 10^{10^{10^{33.94705}}} or exactly e^{e^{e^{79}}}
- Moser's number
- Graham's number – Upper bound on the answer to a problem in Ramsey theory
- TREE(3)
- SSCG(3)
- Rayo's number – Claimed to be the largest named number

== See also ==
- -yllion – Mathematical notation
- Aleph number – Infinite cardinal number
- Asaṃkhyeya – Sanskrit term for a large number
- Chinese numerals – Characters used to denote numbers in Chinese
- History of large numbers
- Indefinite and fictitious numbers
- Indian numbering system – Indian convention of naming large numbers
- Infinity – Mathematical concept
- Japanese numerals – Number words used in the Japanese language
- Knuth's up-arrow notation – Method of notation of very large integers
- Law of large numbers – Averages of repeated trials converge to the expected value
- List of numbers
- Long and short scale – Different meanings for numbers
- Metric prefix – Order of magnitude indicator
- Names of small numbers
- Number names – Word or phrase which describes a numerical quantity
- Number prefix – Prefix derived from numerals or other numbers
- Orders of magnitude – Scale of numbers with a fixed ratio
- Orders of magnitude (data) – Computer data measurements and scales
- Orders of magnitude (numbers)
- Power of 10 – Ten raised to an integer power
