= Estienne de La Roche =

French mathematician

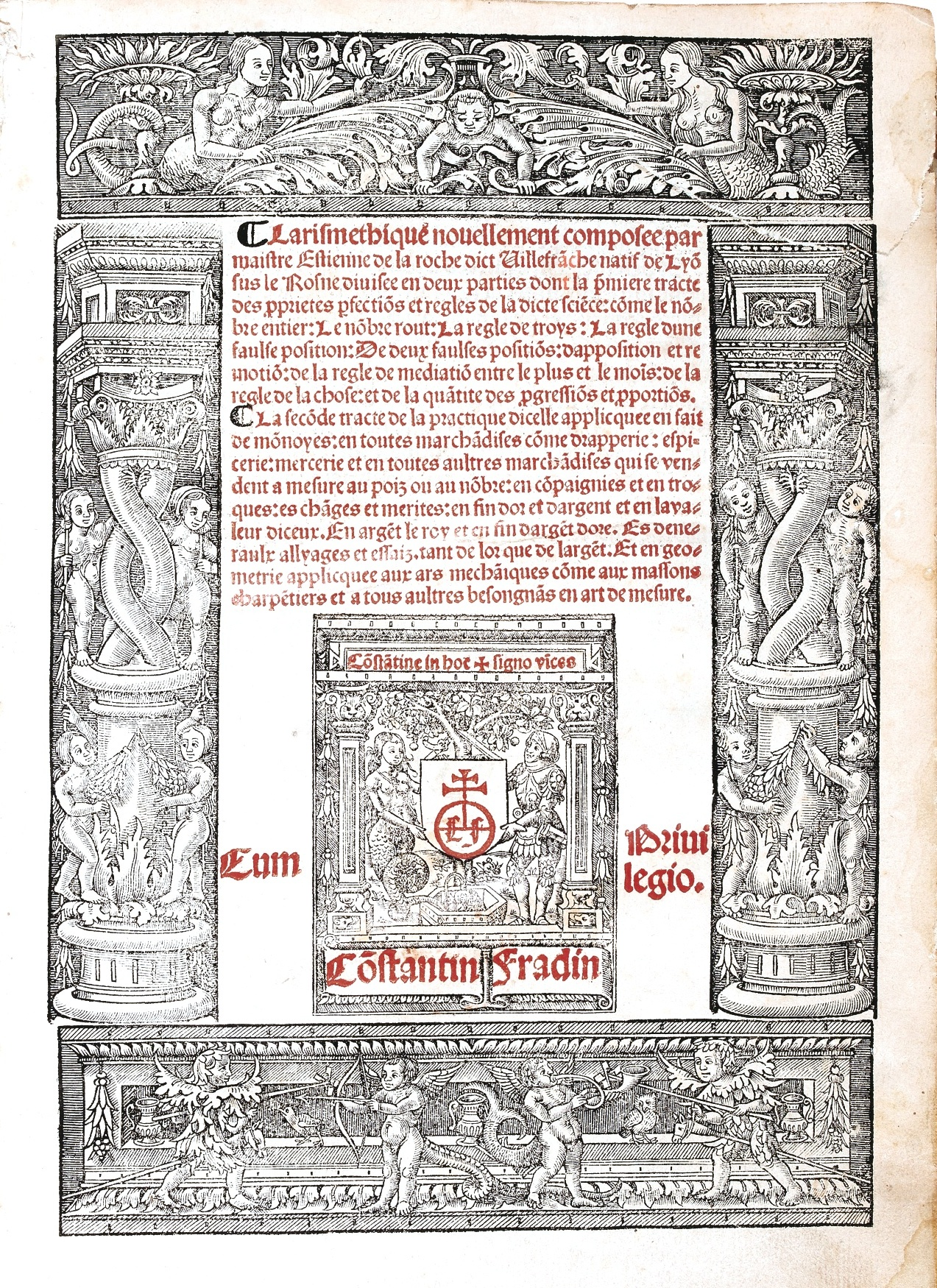
- Title page of Larismethique's first edition (Lyon, 1520)
- Born: 1470; Lyon, France
- Died: 1530, aged 60; France
- Other names: Estienne de Villefranche
- Occupation: Mathematician

Estienne de La Roche (1470–1530) was a French mathematician.

Sometimes known as Estienne de Villefranche, La Roche was born in Lyon, but his family also owned property in Villefranche-sur-Saône, where he lived during his youth. He studied mathematics with Nicolas Chuquet. Having in his possession Chuquet's manuscripts, it is probable that La Roche was on good terms with Chuquet. He taught commercial mathematics in Lyon for 25 years. He is regarded today as a professor of arithmetic (at the time, Master of Figures).

In 1520, he published L'Arismetique, regarded at the time as an excellent handbook of algebra using an elegant notation for powers, square roots and roots of a higher nature. However, in 1880, Aristide Marre published the book Triparty by Chuquet, and it proved that the first part of L'Arismetique was essentially a copy of the algebra of Chuquet. La Roche did try to teach significant mathematics, inaccessible at the time to a French audience, and thus was not merely a plagiarist. He was the worthy successor of several masters and experts in his art, such as Luca Pacioli. La Roche may have borrowed from or been influenced by several mathematicians, including Chuquet, Pacioli and Philippe Frescobaldi, a French banker who wrote some books of mathematics.
