= Jacques Pelletier du Mans =

French humanist, poet, mathematician (1517–1582)

- Born: 25 July 1517; Le Mans, Maine, France
- Died: 17 July 1582 (aged 64); Paris, France
- Occupations: Humanist, Poet, Mathematician

Jacques Pelletier du Mans, also spelled Peletier (Latin: Iacobus Peletarius Cenomani, 25 July 1517 – 17 July 1582) was a humanist, poet and mathematician of the French Renaissance.

== Life ==
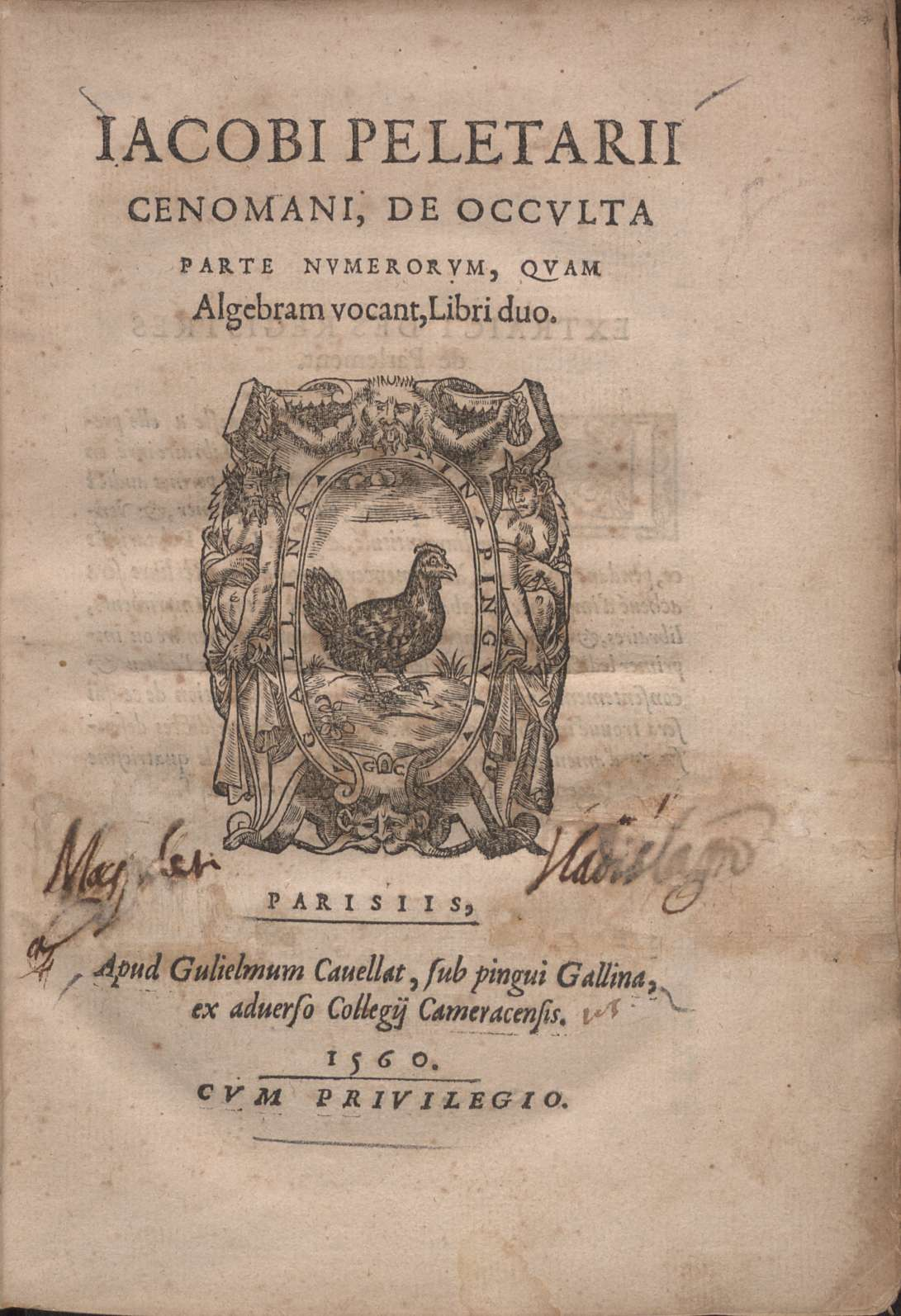
De occulta parte numerorum, quam algebram vocant, 1560

Born in Le Mans into a bourgeois family, he studied at the Collège de Navarre in Paris, where his brother Jean was a professor of mathematics and philosophy. He subsequently studied law and medicine, frequented the literary circle around Marguerite de Navarre and from 1541 to 1543 he was secretary to René du Bellay. In 1541 he published the first French translation of Horace's Ars Poetica and during this period he also published numerous scientific and mathematical treatises.

In 1547 he produced a funeral oration for Henry VIII of England and published his first poems (Œuvres poétiques), which included translations from the first two cantos of Homer's Odyssey and the first book of Virgil's Georgics, twelve Petrarchian sonnets, three Horacian odes and a Martial-like epigram; this poetry collection also included the first published poems of Joachim Du Bellay and Pierre de Ronsard (Ronsard would include Jacques Pelletier into his list of revolutionary contemporary poets (La Pléiade). He then began to frequent a humanist circle around Théodore de Bèze, Jean Martin, Denis Sauvage.

In the Renaissance, the French language had acquired many inconsistencies in spelling through attempts to model French words on their Latin roots (see Middle French). Pelletier tried to reform French spelling in his 1550 treatise Dialoguɇ Dɇ l’Ortografɇ e Prononciation Françoęſɇ ("Dialogue on French spelling and pronunciation"), advocating a phonetic-based spelling using new typographic signs which he would continue to use in all his published works. In this system, he consistently spells his name with one "l": Iacquɇs Pɇlɇtier du Mans.

Pelletier was principal of the Collège de Bayeux and subsequently spent many years in Bordeaux, Poitiers, Piedmont (where he may have been the tutor of the son of Maréchal de Brissac), and Lyon (where he frequented the poets and humanists Maurice Scève, Louise Labé, Olivier de Magny and Pontus de Tyard). In 1555 he published a manual of poetic composition, Art poétique français, a Latin oration calling for peace from King Henry II and Emperor Charles V, and a new collection of poetry, L'Amour des amours (consisting of a sonnet cycle and a series of encyclopedic poems describing meteors, planets and the heavens), which would influence that poets Guillaume du Bartas and Jean-Antoine de Baïf.

His last years were spent in travels to the Savoy, Germany, Switzerland, possibly Italy and various regions in France and in publishing numerous works in Latin on algebra, geometry and mathematics and medicine (including a refutation of Galen and a work on the plague). In 1572, he was briefly director of the College of Aquitaine in Bordeaux, but, bored by the position, he resigned. During this period, he was friends with Michel de Montaigne and Pierre de Brach. In 1579, he returned to Paris and was named director of the College of Le Mans. A final collection of poetry Louanges was published in 1581.

Pelletier died in Paris in July or August 1582.

== New naming convention for large numbers ==
While maintaining the original system of the French mathematician Nicolas Chuquet (1484) for the names of large numbers, Jacques Pelletier promoted milliard for 10^{12} which had been used earlier by Budaeus. In the late 17th century, milliard was subsequently reduced to 10^{9}. This convention is used widely in long scale countries.

The Chuquet-Pelletier system (long scale)
Base 10	Systematics	Chuquet	Peletier	SI Prefix
10^{0}	Million^{0}	Unit	Unit	No prefix
10^{3}	Million^{0.5}	Thousand	Thousand	Kilo- (k)
10^{6}	Million^{1}	Million	Million	Mega- (M)
10^{9}	Million^{1.5}	Thousand million	Milliard	Giga- (G)
10^{12}	Million^{2}	Billion	Billion	Tera- (T)
10^{15}	Million^{2.5}	Thousand billion	Billiard	Peta- (P)
10^{18}	Million^{3}	Trillion	Trillion	Exa- (E)
10^{21}	Million^{3.5}	Thousand trillion	Trilliard	Zetta- (Z)
10^{24}	Million^{4}	Quadrillion	Quadrillion	Yotta- (Y)

== See also ==
- English-language numerals
- French Renaissance literature
- Humanism
- Names of large numbers
- Nicolas Chuquet
- List of numbers
- Long and short scales
