= Long and short scales =

Different meanings for numbers

The long and short scales are two powers-of-ten number-naming systems that are consistent with each other for smaller numbers, but are distinct for larger numbers. Much of the world has adopted either the short or long scale. Countries using the long scale include most countries in continental Europe and most that are French-speaking, German-speaking and Spanish-speaking. Use of the short scale is found in most English-speaking and Arabic-speaking countries, as well as most Eurasian Post-Soviet countries, Israel, and Brazil.

For smaller powers of ten (one, ten, hundred, thousand, and million), the short and long scales are identical; they however differ for larger powers of ten. The long scale grows between names by multiples of one million (10^{6}) whereas the short scale grows by multiples of one thousand (10^{3}). For example, the short scale billion is one thousand million (10^{9}), whereas in the long scale, billion is one million million (10^{12}), making the word 'billion' a false friend between long- and short-scale languages. The long scale system includes additional names for interleaved values, typically replacing the word-ending '-ion' with '-iard'.

To avoid confusion, the International System of Units (SI) recommends using the metric prefixes to indicate magnitude. For example, giga- is always 10^{9}, which is 'billion' in short scale but 'milliard' in long scale.

Other numbering systems, particularly in East Asia and South Asia, have large number naming that differs from both the long and the short scales. Such numbering systems include the Indian numbering system and Chinese, Japanese, and Korean numerals.

== Naming ==
In both scales, names are given to orders of magnitude at increments of 1000. Both systems use the same names for magnitudes less than 10^{9}. Differences arise from the use of identical names for larger magnitudes. For the same magnitude name (n-illion), the value is 10^{3n+3} in the short scale but 10^{6n} in the long scale for positive integers n.

In some languages, the long scale uses additional names for the intermediate multipliers, replacing the ending -ion with -iard; for example, the next multiplier after million is milliard (10^{9}); after a billion it is billiard (10^{15}). Hence, a long scale n-illiard equals 10^{6n+3}.

The following table shows the size of the first few short and long-scale magnitudes. Notice how billion, trillion, and quadrillion are in both scales but have different sizes.

Quantity	Short scale	Long scale
10^{6}	million	million
10^{9}	billion	milliard
10^{12}	trillion	billion
10^{15}	quadrillion	billiard
10^{18}	quintillion	trillion
10^{21}	sextillion	trilliard
10^{24}	septillion	quadrillion
10^{27}	octillion	quadrilliard

== Comparison ==
The following tables show the corresponding names and values of the two scales.

Note that instead of using an intermediate long scale word (illiard), a quantity is sometimes specified in terms of the smaller illion word. For example, "thousand billion" instead of "billiard".

Value	Metric prefix	Short scale	Long scale
1	—	one	
10	deca	ten	
10^{2}	hecto	hundred	
10^{3}	kilo	thousand	
10^{6}	mega	million	
10^{9}	giga	billion	milliard
10^{12}	tera	trillion	billion
10^{15}	peta	quadrillion	billiard
10^{18}	exa	quintillion	trillion
10^{21}	zetta	sextillion	trilliard
10^{24}	yotta	septillion	quadrillion
10^{27}	ronna	octillion	quadrilliard
10^{30}	quetta	nonillion	quintillion

The different sizes of the same name of the two scales can be described as:

Name	Short scale	Long scale
million	10^{6}	10^{6}
billion	10^{9}	10^{12}
trillion	10^{12}	10^{18}
quadrillion	10^{15}	10^{24}
quintillion	10^{18}	10^{30}
	...	...
n-illion	10^{3n+3}	10^{6n}

== Avoiding confusion ==
One way to avoid confusion between the two scales is to use positional notation. For example, 1,000,000,000,000 rather than 1 trillion (short scale) or 1 billion (long scale). This method becomes unwieldy for very large numbers.

Another way is to combine unambiguous words: ten, hundred, thousand, and million. For example: one thousand million and one million million, though this also becomes unwieldy with longer numbers. Methods that are better at longer numbers include:

- Scientific notation (for example 1.2×10^{10}), or its engineering notation variant (for example 12×10^{9}, where the exponent–here 9–is a multiple of 3), or the computing variant E notation (for example 1.2e10). These are the most common practices among scientists and mathematicians, but can be cumbersome in spoken word.
- SI metric prefixes. For example, giga for 10^{9} and tera for 10^{12} can give gigawatt (10^{9} W) and terawatt (10^{12} W). These prefixes can be used unambiguously even with non-SI units. For example: giga-dollars, megabucks, k€, and M€. An exception to this is digital storage, where it is still common practice to use prefixes incorrectly, such as using kilobyte to refer to 1024 bytes (a kibibyte) instead of 1000 bytes or using megabyte to refer to 1,048,576 bytes (a mebibyte) instead of 1,000,000.

== History ==
Although this situation has been developing since the 17th century, the first recorded use of the terms short scale (French: échelle courte) and long scale (French: échelle longue) was by the French mathematician Geneviève Guitel in 1975.

=== Etymology ===
The term billion originally meant 10^{12} when introduced: etymologically it derived from bymillion (a double million), just as trillion derives from trimillion (a triple million). In long scale countries, milliard was defined to its current value of 10^{9}, leaving billion at its original 10^{12} value and so on for the larger numbers. Some of these countries, but not all, introduced new words billiard, trilliard, etc. as intermediate terms. In some short scale countries, milliard was defined to 10^{9} and billion dropped altogether, with trillion redefined down to 10^{12} and so on for the larger numbers. In many short scale countries, milliard was dropped altogether and billion was redefined down to 10^{9}, adjusting downwards the value of trillion and all the larger numbers.

The word million derives from the Old French milion from the earlier Old Italian milione, an intensification of the Latin word, mille, a thousand. That is, a million is a big thousand, much as a great gross is a dozen gross or 12 × 144 = 1728.

The word milliard, or its translation, is found in many European languages and is used in those languages for 10^{9}. However, it is not found in American English, which uses billion, and not used in British English, which preferred to use thousand million before the current usage of billion. The financial term yard, which derives from milliard, is used on financial markets, as, unlike the term billion, it is internationally unambiguous and phonetically distinct from million. Likewise, many long scale countries use the word billiard (or similar) for one thousand long scale billions (i.e., 10^{15}), and the word trilliard (or similar) for one thousand long scale trillions (i.e., 10^{21}), etc.

=== Evolution ===
The short scale was never widespread before its general adoption in the United States. It has been taught in American schools since the early 1800s. It has since become common in other English-speaking nations and several other countries. For most of the 19th and early 20th centuries, the United Kingdom largely used the long scale, whereas the United States used the short scale, so that the two systems were often referred to as British and American in the English language. After several decades of increasing informal British usage of the short scale, in 1974 the government of the UK adopted it, and it is used for all official purposes. The British usage and American usage are now identical.

The existence of the different scales means that care must be taken when comparing large numbers between languages or countries, or when interpreting old documents in countries where the dominant scale has changed over time. For example, British English, French, and Italian historical documents can refer to either the short or long scale, depending on the date of the document, since each of the three countries has used both systems at various times in its history. Today, the United Kingdom officially uses the short scale, but France and Italy use the long scale.

The pre-1974 former British English word billion, post-1961 current French word billion, post-1994 current Italian word bilione, Spanish billón, German Billion, Dutch biljoen, Danish billion, Swedish biljon, Finnish biljoona, Slovenian bilijon, Polish bilion, and European Portuguese word bilião (with a different spelling to the Brazilian Portuguese variant, but in Brazil referring to short scale) all refer to 10^{12}, being long-scale terms. Therefore, each of these words translates to the American English or post-1974 British English word: trillion (10^{12} in the short scale), and not billion (10^{9} in the short scale).

On the other hand, the pre-1961 former French word billion, pre-1994 former Italian word bilione, Brazilian Portuguese word bilhão, and Welsh word biliwn all refer to 10^{9}, being short scale terms. Each of these words translates to the American English or post-1974 British English word billion (10^{9} in the short scale).

=== Timeline ===
Date	Event
13th century	The word million was not used in any language before the 13th century. The monk and polymath Maximus Planudes (c. 1260–1305) was among the first recorded users of the word to document Mediterranean trade between Constantinople and Italian states. Over the next two centuries, the term became widely accepted and was adopted by other Italian states, France and other European countries.
Late 14th century	Piers Plowman, a 17th-century copy of the original 14th-century allegorical narrative poem by William Langland The word million entered the English language. One of the earliest references is William Langland's Piers Plowman (written c. 1360–1387 in Middle English), with Coueyte not his goodes For millions of moneye Translation: Covet not his goods for millions of money
1475	French mathematician Jehan Adam, writing in Middle French, recorded the words bymillion and trimillion as meaning 10^{12} and 10^{18} respectively in a manuscript Traicté en arismetique pour la practique par gectouers, now held in the Bibliothèque Sainte-Geneviève in Paris.... item noctes que le premier greton dembas vault ung, le second vault dix, le trois vault cent, le quart vult [sic] mille, le Ve vault dix M, le VIe vault cent M, le VIIe vault Milion, Le VIIIe vault dix Million, Le IXe vault cent Millions, Le Xe vault Mil Millions, Le XIe vault dix mil Millions, Le XIIe vault Cent mil Millions, Le XIIIe vault bymillion, Le XIIIIe vault dix bymillions, Le XVe vault cent mil [sic] bymillions, Le XVIe vault mil bymillions, Le XVIIe vault dix Mil bymillions, Le XVIIIe vault cent mil bymillions, Le XIXe vault trimillion, Le XXe vault dix trimillions ... Translation:... Likewise, note that the first counter from the bottom is worth one, the 2nd is worth ten, the 3rd is worth one hundred, the 4th is worth one thousand, the 5th is worth ten thousand, the 6th is worth one hundred thousand, the 7th is worth a million, the 8th is worth ten millions, the 9th is worth one hundred millions, the 10th is worth one thousand millions, the 11th is worth ten thousand millions, the 12th is worth one hundred thousand million, the 13th is worth a bymillion, the 14th is worth ten bymillions, the 15th is worth one [hundred] bymillions, the 16th is worth one thousand bymillions, the 17th is worth ten thousand bymillions, the 18th is worth hundred thousand bymillions, the 19th is worth a trimillion, the 20th is worth ten trimillions ...
1484	Le Triparty en la Science des Nombres par Maistre Nicolas Chuquet Parisien an extract from Chuquet's original 1484 manuscript French mathematician Nicolas Chuquet, in his article Le Triparty en la Science des Nombres par Maistre Nicolas Chuquet Parisien, used the words byllion, tryllion, quadrillion, quyllion, sixlion, septyllion, ottyllion, and nonyllion to refer to 10^{12}, 10^{18}, ... 10^{54}. Most of the work was copied without attribution by Estienne de La Roche and published in his 1520 book, L'arismetique. Chuquet's original article was rediscovered in the 1870s and then published for the first time in 1880....[preder s'] Item l'on doit savoir que ung million vault mille milliers de unitez, et ung byllion vault mille milliers de millions, et [ung] tryllion vault mille milliers de byllions, et ung quadrillion vault mille milliers de tryllions et ainsi des aultres : Et de ce en est pose ung exemple nombre divise et punctoye ainsi que devant est dit, tout lequel nombre monte 745324 tryllions 804300 byllions 700023 millions 654321. Exemple : 745324'8043000'700023'654321 ... [sic] Translation:...likewise, one should know that a million is worth a thousand thousand units, and a byllion is worth a thousand thousand millions, and tryllion is worth a thousand thousand byllions, and a quadrillion is worth a thousand thousand tryllions, and so on for the others. And an example of this follows, a number divided up and punctuated as previously described, the whole number being 745324 tryllions, 804300 byllions 700023 millions 654321. Example: 745324'8043000'700023'654321 ... [sic] The extract from Chuquet's manuscript, the transcription and translation provided here all contain an original mistake: one too many zeros in the 804300 portion of the fully written out example: 745324'8043000 '700023'654321 ...
1516	Guilielmus Budaeus or Guillaume Budé (1467–1540) French mathematician Budaeus (Guillaume Budé), writing in Latin, used the term milliart to mean "ten myriad myriad" or 10^{9} in his book De Asse et partibus eius Libri quinque... hoc est decem myriadum myriadas:quod vno verbo nostrates abaci studiosi Milliartum appellant:quasi millionum millionem Translation:.. this is ten myriad myriads, which in one word our students of numbers call Milliart, as if a million millions
1549	The influential French mathematician Jacques Pelletier du Mans used the name milliard (or milliart) to mean 10^{12}, attributing the term to the earlier usage by Guillaume Budé
17th century	With the increased usage of large numbers, the traditional punctuation of large numbers into six-digit groups evolved into three-digit group punctuation. In some places, the large number names were then applied to the smaller numbers, following the new punctuation scheme. Thus, in France and Italy, some scientists then began using billion to mean 10^{9}, trillion to mean 10^{12}, etc. This usage formed the origins of the later short scale. The majority of scientists either continued to say thousand million or changed the meaning of the Pelletier term, milliard, from "million of millions" down to "thousand million". This meaning of milliard has been occasionally used in England, but was widely adopted in France, Germany, Italy and the rest of Europe, for those keeping the original long scale billion from Adam, Chuquet and Pelletier.
1676	The first published use of milliard as 10^{9} occurred in the Netherlands... milliart/ofte duysent millioenen.. Translation:..milliart / also thousand millions..
1729	The short-scale meaning of the term billion had already been brought to the British American colonies. The first American appearance of the short scale value of billion as 10^{9} was published in the Greenwood Book of 1729, written anonymously by Prof. Isaac Greenwood of Harvard College.
Late 18th century	As early as 1762 (and through at least the early 20th century), the dictionary of the Académie française defined billion as a term of arithmetic meaning a thousand millions.
Early 19th century	France widely converted to the short scale, and was followed by the U.S., which began teaching it in schools. Many French encyclopedias of the 19th century either omitted the long scale system or called it "désormais obsolète", a now obsolete system. Nevertheless, by the mid 20th century France would officially convert back to the long scale.
1926	A Dictionary of Modern English Usage by H. W. Fowler H. W. Fowler's A Dictionary of Modern English Usage noted It should be remembered that "billion" does not mean in American use (which follows the French) what it means in British. For to us it means the second power of a million, i.e. a million millions (1,000,000,000,000); for Americans it means a thousand multiplied by itself twice, or a thousand millions (1,000,000,000), what we call a milliard. Since billion in our sense is useless except to astronomers, it is a pity that we do not conform. Although American English usage did not change, within the next 50 years, French usage changed from short scale to long, and British English usage changed from long scale to short.
1948	The 9th General Conference on Weights and Measures received requests to establish an International System of Units. One such request was accompanied by a draft French Government discussion paper, which included a suggestion of universal use of the long scale, inviting the short-scale countries to return or convert. This paper was widely distributed as the basis for further discussion. The matter of the International System of Units was eventually resolved at the 11th General Conference in 1960. The question of long scale versus short scale was not resolved and does not appear in the list of any conference resolutions.
1960	The 11th General Conference on Weights and Measures adopted the International System of Units (SI), with its own set of numeric prefixes. SI is therefore independent of the number scale being used. SI also notes the language-dependence of some larger-number names and advises against using ambiguous terms such as billion, trillion, etc. The National Institute of Standards and Technology within the US also considers that it is best that they be avoided entirely.
1961	The French Government confirmed their official usage of the long scale in the Journal officiel (the official French Government gazette).
1974	British prime minister Harold Wilson (1916–1995) British prime minister Harold Wilson explained in a written answer to the House of Commons that UK government statistics would from then on use the short scale, reported in Hansard for 20 December 1974: Mr. Maxwell-Hyslop asked the Prime Minister whether he would make it the practice of his administration that when Ministers employ the word 'billion' in any official speeches, documents, or answers to Parliamentary Questions, they will, to avoid confusion, only do so in its British meaning of 1 million million and not in the sense in which it is used in the United States of America, which uses the term 'billion' to mean 1,000 million. The Prime Minister: No. The word 'billion' is now used internationally to mean 1,000 million and it would be confusing if British Ministers were to use it in any other sense. I accept that it could still be interpreted in this country as 1 million million and I shall ask my colleagues to ensure that, if they do use it, there should be no ambiguity as to its meaning. The BBC and other UK mass media quickly followed the government's lead within the UK. During the last quarter of the 20th century, most other English-speaking countries (Ireland, Australia, New Zealand, South Africa, Zimbabwe, etc.) either also followed this lead or independently switched to the short scale use. However, in most of these countries, some limited long scale use persists and the official status of the short scale use is not clear.
1975	French mathematician Geneviève Guitel introduced the terms long scale (French: échelle longue) and short scale (French: échelle courte) to refer to the two numbering systems.
1994	The Italian Government confirmed their official usage of the long scale.

== Current usage ==
Short and long scale usage throughout the world Long scale Short scale Short scale with milliard instead of billion Both scales Other naming system No data

=== Short scale users ===
==== English-speaking ====
10^{6}, one million; 10^{9}, one billion; 10^{12}, one trillion; etc.

Most English-language countries and regions use the short scale with 10^{9} being billion. For example: (Note: English language countries: Apart from the United States, the long scale was used for centuries in many English language countries before being superseded in recent times by short scale usage. Because of this history, some long scale use persists and the official status of the short scale in anglophone countries other than the UK and US is sometimes obscure.)

- Australia (Note: Australian usage: In Australia, education, media outlets, and literature all use the short scale in line with other English-speaking countries. The current recommendation by the Australian Government Department of Finance and Deregulation (formerly known as AusInfo), and the legal definition, is the short scale. As recently as 1999, the same department did not consider short scale to be standard, but only used it occasionally. Some documents use the term thousand million for 10^{9} in cases where two amounts are being compared using a common unit of one 'million'. In 2025, Australian Government Style Manual uses short scale as the standard.)
- Canada (English-speaking) see Using both below
- Ireland (English-speaking, Irish: billiún, trilliún)
- United Kingdom (Note: British usage: Billion has meant 10^{9} in most sectors of official published writing for many years now. The UK government, the BBC, and most other broadcast or published mass media, have used the short scale in all contexts since the mid-1970s. Before the widespread use of billion for 10^{9}, UK usage generally referred to thousand million rather than milliard. The long scale term milliard, for 10^{9}, is obsolete in British English, though its derivative, yard, is still used as slang in the London money, foreign exchange, and bond markets.)
- United States (Note: American usage: In the United States, the short scale has been taught in school since the early 19th century. It is therefore used exclusively.)

==== Arabic-speaking ====
10^{6}, مَلْيُوْن milyūn; 10^{9}, مِلْيَار milyar; 10^{12}, تِرِلْيُوْن tirilyūn; etc.

Most Arabic-language countries and regions use the short scale with 10^{9} being مليار milyar, except for a few countries like Saudi Arabia and the UAE which use the word بليون billion for 10^{9}. For example: (Note: Arabic language countries: Most Arabic-language countries use: 10^{6}, مليون million; 10^{9}, مليار milyar; 10^{12}, ترليون trilyon; etc.)

- Algeria
- Egypt
- Iraq
- Morocco
- Saudi Arabia
- United Arab Emirates

==== Other short scale ====
10^{6}, one million; 10^{9}, one milliard or one billion; 10^{12}, one trillion; etc.

Other countries also use a word similar to trillion to mean 10^{12}, etc. Whilst a few of these countries like English use a word similar to billion to mean 10^{9}, most like Arabic have kept a traditionally long scale word similar to milliard for 10^{9}. Some examples of short scale use, and the words used for 10^{9} and 10^{12}, are

- Brazil (bilhão, trilhão)
- Indonesia (miliar, triliun) (Note: Indonesian usage: Large numbers are common in Indonesia, in part because its currency (rupiah) is generally expressed in large numbers (the lowest common circulating denomination is Rp100 with Rp1000 is considered as base unit). The term juta, equivalent to million (10^{6}), is generally common in daily life. Indonesia officially employs the term miliar (derived from the long scale Dutch word miljard) for the number 10^{9}, with no exception. For 10^{12} and greater, Indonesia follows the short scale, thus 10^{12} is named triliun. The term seribu miliar (a thousand milliards) or more rarely sejuta juta (a million millions) or sejuta berkali-kali (a millions after a million or a millions over a million) are also used for 10^{12} less often. Terms greater than triliun are not very familiar to Indonesians.)
- Israel (Hebrew: מיליארד milyard, טריליון trilyon)
- Russia (миллиард milliard, триллион trillion)
- Turkey (milyar, trilyon)

=== Long scale users ===
The long scale is used by most Continental European countries and by most other countries whose languages derive from Continental Europe (with the notable exceptions of Albania, Greece, Romania and Brazil). These countries use a word similar to billion to mean 10^{12}. Some use a word similar to milliard to mean 10^{9}, while others use a word or phrase equivalent to thousand millions.

==== Dutch-speaking ====
10^{6}, miljoen; 10^{9}, miljard; 10^{12}, biljoen; etc.

Most Dutch-language countries and regions use the long scale with 10^{9} = miljard.

==== French-speaking ====
10^{6}, million; 10^{9}, milliard; 10^{12}, billion; etc.

Most French-language countries and regions use the long scale with 10^{9} = milliard, for example: (Note: French usage: France, with Italy, was one of two European countries which converted from the long scale to the short scale during the 19th century, but returned to the original long scale during the 20th century. In 1961, the French Government confirmed their long scale status. However the 9th edition of the dictionary of the Académie française describes billion as an outdated synonym of milliard, and says that the new meaning of 10^{12} was decreed in 1961, but never caught on.)

- Canada (Canadian French) see Using both below
- France

==== German-speaking ====
10^{6}, Million; 10^{9}, Milliarde; 10^{12}, Billion; etc.

German-language countries and regions use the long scale with 10^{9} = Milliarde.

==== Portuguese-speaking ====
10^{6}, milhão; 10^{9}, mil milhões or milhar de milhões; 10^{12}, bilião

With the notable exception of Brazil, a short scale country, most Portuguese-language countries and regions use the long scale with 10^{9} = mil milhões or milhar de milhões.

==== Spanish-speaking ====
10^{6}, millón; 10^{9}, mil millones or millardo; 10^{12}, billón; etc.

Most Spanish-language countries and regions use the long scale, for example: (Note: Spanish language countries: Spanish-speaking countries sometimes use millardo (milliard) for 10^{9}, but mil millones (thousand millions) is used more frequently. The word billón is sometimes used in the short scale sense in those countries more influenced by the United States, where "billion" means "one thousand millions". The usage of billón to mean "one thousand millions", controversial from the start, was denounced by the Royal Spanish Academy as recently as 2010, but was finally accepted in a later version of the official dictionary as standard usage among educated Spanish speakers in the United States (including Puerto Rico).)

- Argentina
- Mexico (mil millones or millardo)
- Spain (millardo or typ. mil millones)

==== Other long scale ====
10^{6}, one million; 10^{9}, one milliard or one thousand million; 10^{12}, one billion; etc.

Some examples of long scale use, and the words used for 10^{9} and 10^{12}, are:

- Czech Republic (miliarda, bilion)
- Denmark (milliard, billion)
- Esperanto (miliardo, duiliono) (Note: Esperanto language usage: The Esperanto language words biliono, triliono etc. used to be ambiguous, and both long and short scale were used and presented in dictionaries. The current edition of the main Esperanto dictionary PIV however recommends the long scale meanings, as does the grammar PMEG. Ambiguity may be avoided by the use of the unofficial but generally recognised suffix -iliono, whose function is analogous to the long scale, i.e. it is appended to a (single) numeral indicating the power of a million, e.g. duiliono (from du meaning "two") = biliono = 10^{12}, triiliono = triliono = 10^{18}, etc. following the 1×10^{6X} long scale convention. Miliardo is an unambiguous term for 10^{9}, and generally the suffix -iliardo, for values 1×10^{6X+3}, for example triliardo = 10^{21} and so forth.)
- Finland (miljardi, biljoona; Swedish: miljard, biljon)
- Iran (Persian: میلیارد miliyard, بیلیون billion, تریلیون trillion)
- Italy (miliardo, bilione) (Note: Italian usage: Italy, with France, was one of the two European countries which partially converted from the long scale to the short scale during the 19th century, but returned to the original long scale in the 20th century. In 1994, the Italian Government confirmed its long scale status. In Italian, the word bilione officially means 10^{12}, trilione means 10^{18}, etc. Colloquially, bilione can mean both 10^{9} and 10^{12}; trilione can mean both 10^{12} and (rarer) 10^{18} and so on. Therefore, in order to avoid ambiguity, they are seldom used. Forms such as miliardo (milliard) for 10^{9}, mille miliardi (a thousand milliards) for 10^{12}, un milione di miliardi (a million milliards) for 10^{15}, un miliardo di miliardi (a milliard of milliards) for 10^{18}, mille miliardi di miliardi (a thousand milliard of milliards) for 10^{21} are more common.)
- Norway (Bokmål: milliard, billion; Nynorsk: milliard, billion)
- Poland (miliard, bilion)
- Romania (miliard, bilion). There are ambiguities for numbers above 10^{12}.
- Sweden (miljard, biljon)
- Switzerland (French: milliard, billion; German: Milliarde, Billion; Italian: miliardo, bilione; Romansh: milliarda, billiun)

=== Using both ===
Some countries use either the short or long scales, depending on the internal language being used or the context.

10^{6}, one million; 10^{9}, either one billion (short scale) or one milliard / thousand million (long scale); 10^{12}, either one trillion (short scale) or one billion (long scale), etc.

Country or territory	Short scale usage	Long scale usage
Canada (Note: Canadian usage: Both scales are in use currently in Canada. English-speaking regions use the short scale exclusively, while French-speaking regions use the long scale, though the Canadian government standards website recommends that in French billion and trillion be avoided, recommending milliard for 10^{9}, and mille milliards (a thousand milliards) for 10^{12}.)	Canadian English (10^{9} = billion, 10^{12} = trillion)	Canadian French (10^{9} = milliard, 10^{12} = billion or mille milliards).
Mauritius; Seychelles; Vanuatu	English (10^{9} = billion, 10^{12} = trillion)	French (10^{9} = milliard, 10^{12} = billion)
Namibia; South Africa (Note: South African usage: South Africa uses both the long scale (in Afrikaans and sometimes English) and the short scale (in English). Unlike the 1974 UK switch, the switch from long scale to short scale took time. As of 2011 most English language publications use the short scale. Some Afrikaans publications briefly attempted usage of the "American System" but that has led to comment in the papers and has been disparaged by the "Taalkommissie" (The Afrikaans Language Commission of the South African Academy of Science and Art) and has thus, to most appearances, been abandoned.)	South African English (10^{9} = billion, 10^{12} = trillion)	Afrikaans (10^{9} = miljard, 10^{12} = biljoen)
Puerto Rico	Economic and technical (10^{9} = billón, 10^{12} = trillón)	Latin American export publications (10^{9} = millardo or mil millones, 10^{12} = billón)

=== Using neither ===
The following countries use naming systems for large numbers that are not etymologically related to the short and long scales:

Country	Number system	Naming of large numbers
Bangladesh; India; Maldives; Nepal; Pakistan	Indian numbering system	Traditional system for everyday use, but short or long scale may also be in use (Note: Indian, Pakistani and Bangladeshi usage: Outside of financial media, the use of billion by Bangladeshi, Indian and Pakistani English speakers highly depends on their educational background. Some may continue to use the traditional British long scale. In everyday life, Bangladeshis, Indians and Pakistanis largely use their own common number system, commonly referred to as the Indian numbering system – for instance, Bangladeshi, Pakistani, and Indian English commonly use the words lakh to denote 100 thousand, crore to denote ten million (i.e. 100 lakhs) and arab to denote thousand million.)
Bhutan	Dzongkha numerals	Traditional system
Cambodia	Khmer numerals	Traditional system
China; Republic of China; South Korea; North Korea; Japan	East Asian numbering system: Chinese numerals; Korean numerals; Japanese numerals	Traditional myriad system for the larger numbers; special words and symbols up to 10^{68}
Greece	Calque of the short scale	Names of the short scale have not been loaned but calqued into Greek, based on the native Greek word for million, εκατομμύριο ekatommyrio ("hundred-myriad", i.e. 100 × 10,000): δισεκατομμύριο disekatommyrio "bi+hundred-myriad" = 10^{9} (short scale billion); τρισεκατομμύριο trisekatommyrio "tri+hundred-myriad" = 10^{12} (short scale trillion); τετράκις εκατομμύριο tetrakis ekatommyrio "quadri+hundred-myriad" = 10^{15} (short scale quadrillion), and so on.
Laos	Lao numerals	Traditional system
Mongolia	Mongolian numerals	Traditional myriad system for the larger numbers; special words up to 10^{67}
Sri Lanka	Sinhala numerals; Tamil numerals	Traditional systems
Thailand	Thai numerals	Traditional system based on millions
Vietnam	Vietnamese numerals	Traditional system(s) based on thousands

=== By continent ===
The long and short scales are both present on most continents, with usage dependent on the language used. For example:

Continent	Short scale usage	Long scale usage
Africa	Arabic (Egypt, Libya), South African English	French (Benin, Guinea), Portuguese (Mozambique)
North America	American English, Canadian English, U.S. Spanish	Canadian French, Mexican Spanish
South America	Brazilian Portuguese, English (Guyana)	American Spanish, Dutch (Suriname), French (French Guiana)
Antarctica	Australian English, British English, New Zealand English, Russian	American Spanish (Argentina, Chile), French (France), Norwegian (Norway)
Asia	Hebrew (Israel), Indonesian, Philippine English	Persian (Iran), Portuguese (East Timor, Macau)
Europe	British English, Russian, Ukrainian, Estonian, Latvian, Lithuanian, Bulgarian, Romanian, Albanian, Turkish	Dutch, French, German, Italian, Portuguese, Spanish, Danish, Swedish, Norwegian, Finnish, Icelandic, Polish, Czech, Slovak, Hungarian, Serbo-Croatian, Slovene, Macedonian
Oceania	Australian English, New Zealand English	French (French Polynesia, New Caledonia)

== See also ==
- Googol (number)
- Googolplex (number)
- Names of large numbers
- Names of small numbers
- Orders of magnitude (numbers)
- Hindu units of time which displays some similar issues
- Indian numbering system
