= History of large numbers =

Different cultures used different traditional numeral systems for naming large numbers. The extent of large numbers used varied in each culture. Two interesting points in using large numbers are the confusion on the term billion and milliard in many countries, and the use of zillion to denote a very large number where precision is not required.

== Indian mathematics ==
Hindu units of time on a logarithmic scale.

The Shukla Yajurveda has a list of names for powers of ten up to 10^{12}. The list given in the Yajurveda text is:

eka (1), daśa (10), mesochi (100), sahasra (1,000), ayuta (10,000), niyuta (100,000), prayuta (1,000,000), arbuda (10,000,000), nyarbuda (100,000,000), saguran (1,000,000,000), madhya (10,000,000,000), anta (100,000,000,000), parârdha (1,000,000,000,000).

Later Hindu and Buddhist texts have extended this list, but these lists are no longer mutually consistent and names of numbers larger than 10^{8} differ between texts.

For example, the Panchavimsha Brahmana lists 10^{9} as nikharva, 10^{10} vâdava, 10^{11} akṣiti, while Śâṅkhyâyana Śrauta Sûtra has 10^{9} nikharva, 10^{10} samudra, 10^{11} salila, 10^{12} antya, 10^{13} ananta. Such lists of names for powers of ten are called daśaguṇottarra saṁjñâ. There area also analogous lists of Sanskrit names for fractional numbers, that is, powers of one tenth.

The Mahayana Lalitavistara Sutra is notable for giving a very extensive such list, with terms going up to 10^{421}. The context is an account of a contest including writing, arithmetic, wrestling and archery, in which the Buddha was pitted against the great mathematician Arjuna and showed off his numerical skills by citing the names of the powers of ten up to 1 'tallakshana', which equals 10^{53}, but then going on to explain that this is just one of a series of counting systems that can be expanded geometrically.

The Avataṃsaka Sūtra, a text associated with the Lokottaravāda school of Buddhism, has an even more extensive list of names for numbers, and it goes beyond listing mere powers of ten introducing concatenation of exponentiation, the largest number mentioned being nirabhilapya nirabhilapya parivarta (Bukeshuo bukeshuo zhuan 不可說不可說轉), corresponding to $10^{7\times 2^{122}}$. though chapter 30 (the Asamkyeyas) in Thomas Cleary's translation of it we find the definition of the number "untold" as exactly 10^{10*2^{122}}, expanded in the 2nd verses to 10^{4*5*2^{121}} and continuing a similar expansion indeterminately. Examples for other names given in the Avatamsaka Sutra include: asaṃkhyeya (असंख्येय) 10^{140}.

The Jain mathematical text Surya Prajnapti (c. 4th–3rd century BCE) classifies all numbers into three sets: enumerable, innumerable, and infinite. Each of these was further subdivided into three orders: enumerable (lowest, intermediate, and highest), innumerable (nearly innumerable, truly innumerable, and innumerably innumerable), and infinite (nearly infinite, truly infinite, infinitely infinite).

In modern India, the terms lakh for 10^{5} and crore for 10^{7} are in common use. Both are vernacular (Hindustani) forms derived from a list of names for powers of ten in Yājñavalkya Smṛti, where 10^{5} and 10^{7} named lakṣa and koṭi, respectively.

== Classical antiquity ==
In the Western world, specific number names for larger numbers did not come into common use until quite recently. The Ancient Greeks used a system based on the myriad, that is, ten thousand, and their largest named number was a myriad myriad, or one hundred million.

In The Sand Reckoner, Archimedes (c. 287–212 BC) devised a system of naming large numbers reaching up to

$$10^{8 \times 10^{16}}$$,

essentially by naming powers of a myriad myriad. This largest number appears because it equals a myriad myriad to the myriad myriadth power, all taken to the myriad myriadth power. This gives a good indication of the notational difficulties encountered by Archimedes, and one can propose that he stopped at this number because he did not devise any new ordinal numbers (larger than 'myriad myriadth') to match his new cardinal numbers. Archimedes only used his system up to 10^{64}.

Archimedes' goal was presumably to name large powers of 10 in order to give rough estimates, but shortly thereafter, Apollonius of Perga invented a more practical system of naming large numbers which were not powers of 10, based on naming powers of a myriad, for example, would be a myriad squared.

Much later, but still in antiquity, the Hellenistic mathematician Diophantus (3rd century) used a similar notation to represent large numbers.

The Romans, who were less interested in theoretical issues, expressed 1,000,000 as decies centena milia, that is, 'ten hundred thousand'; it was only in the 13th century that the (originally French) word 'million' was introduced.

== Modern use of large finite numbers ==
Far larger finite numbers than any of these occur in modern mathematics. For instance, Graham's number is too large to reasonably express using exponentiation or even tetration. For more about modern usage for large numbers, see Large numbers. To handle these numbers, new notations are created and used. There is a large community of mathematicians dedicated to naming large numbers. Rayo's number has been claimed to be the largest named number.

== Infinity ==
The ultimate in large numbers was, until recently, the concept of infinity, a number defined by being greater than any finite number, and used in the mathematical theory of limits.

However, since the 19th century, mathematicians have studied transfinite numbers, numbers which are not only greater than any finite number, but also, from the viewpoint of set theory, larger than the traditional concept of infinity. Of these transfinite numbers, perhaps the most extraordinary, and arguably, if they exist, "largest", are the large cardinals.
