= Cutler's bar notation =

Arithmetic notation system

In mathematics, Cutler's bar notation is a notation system for large numbers, introduced by Mark Cutler in 2004. The idea is based on iterated exponentiation in much the same way that exponentiation is iterated multiplication.

== Introduction ==
A regular exponential can be expressed as such:

$$\begin{matrix}
a^b & = & \underbrace{a_{} \times a \times\dots \times a} \\
& & b\mbox{ copies of }a
\end{matrix}$$

However, these expressions become arbitrarily large when dealing with systems such as Knuth's up-arrow notation. Take the following:

$$\begin{matrix}
& \underbrace{a_{}^{a^{{}^{.\,^{.\,^{.\,^a}}}}}} &
\\
& b\mbox{ copies of }a
\end{matrix}$$

Cutler's bar notation shifts these exponentials counterclockwise, forming ${^b} \bar a$. A bar is placed above the variable to denote this change. As such:

$$\begin{matrix}
{^b} \bar a = & \underbrace{a_{}^{a^{{}^{.\,^{.\,^{.\,^a}}}}}} &
\\
& b\mbox{ copies of }a
\end{matrix}$$

This system becomes effective with multiple exponents, when regular denotation becomes too cumbersome.

$$\begin{matrix}
^{^b{b}} \bar a = & \underbrace{a_{}^{a^{{}^{.\,^{.\,^{.\,^a}}}}}} &
\\
& {{^b} \bar a}\mbox{ copies of }a
\end{matrix}$$

At any time, this can be further shortened by rotating the exponential counterclockwise once more.

$$\begin{matrix}
\underbrace{b_{}^{b^{{}^{.\,^{.\,^{.\,^b}}}}}}  \bar a = {_c} \bar a
\\
c \mbox{ copies of } b
\end{matrix}$$

The same pattern could be iterated a fourth time, becoming $\bar a_{d}$. For this reason, it is sometimes referred to as Cutler's circular notation.

== Advantages and drawbacks ==
The Cutler bar notation can be used to easily express other notation systems in exponent form. It also allows for a flexible summarization of multiple copies of the same exponents, where any number of stacked exponents can be shifted counterclockwise and shortened to a single variable. The bar notation also allows for fairly rapid composure of very large numbers. For instance, the number $\bar {10}_{10}$ would contain more than a googolplex digits, while remaining fairly simple to write with and remember.

However, the system reaches a problem when dealing with different exponents in a single expression. For instance, the expression $^{a^{b^{b^{c}}}}$ could not be summarized in bar notation. Additionally, the exponent can only be shifted thrice before it returns to its original position, making a five degree shift indistinguishable from a one degree shift. Some have suggested using a double and triple bar in subsequent rotations, though this presents problems when dealing with ten- and twenty-degree shifts.

Other equivalent notations for the same operations already exist without being limited to a fixed number of recursions, notably Knuth's up-arrow notation and hyperoperation notation.

== See also ==
- Mathematical notation
