= Arrow notation =

Arrow notation may refer to:

- Conway chained arrow notation
- Knuth's up-arrow notation
- Arrow notation (Ramsey theory), or infinitary combinatorics
- Arrow notation as a way of representing functions
