= Steinhaus–Moser notation =

Notation for extremely large numbers

In mathematics, Steinhaus–Moser notation is a notation for expressing certain large numbers. It is an extension (devised by Leo Moser) of Hugo Steinhaus's polygon notation.

== Definitions ==
a number n in a triangle means n^{n}.

a number n in a square is equivalent to "the number n inside n triangles, which are all nested."

a number n in a pentagon is equivalent to "the number n inside n squares, which are all nested."

etc.: n written in an (m + 1)-sided polygon is equivalent to "the number n inside n nested m-sided polygons". In a series of nested polygons, they are associated inward. The number n inside two triangles is equivalent to n^{n} inside one triangle, which is equivalent to n^{n} raised to the power of n^{n}.

Steinhaus defined only the triangle, the square, and the circle, which is equivalent to the pentagon defined above.

== Special values ==
Steinhaus defined:

- mega is the number equivalent to 2 in a circle: ②
- megiston is the number equivalent to 10 in a circle: ⑩

Moser's number is the number represented by "2 in a megagon". Megagon is here the name of a polygon with "mega" sides (not to be confused with the polygon with one million sides).

Alternative notations:

- use the functions square(x) and triangle(x)
- let M(n, m, p) be the number represented by the number n in m nested p-sided polygons; then the rules are:
  - $M(n,1,3) = n^n$
  - $M(n,1,p+1) = M(n,n,p)$
  - $M(n,m+1,p) = M(M(n,1,p),m,p)$
- and
  - mega = $M(2,1,5)$
  - megiston = $M(10,1,5)$
  - moser = $M(2,1,M(2,1,5))$

== Mega ==
A mega, ②, is already a very large number, since ② = square(square(2)) = square(triangle(triangle(2))) = square(triangle(2^{2})) = square(triangle(4)) = square(4^{4}) = square(256) = triangle(triangle(triangle(...triangle(256)...))) [256 triangles] = triangle(triangle(triangle(...triangle(256^{256})...))) [255 triangles] ~ triangle(triangle(triangle(...triangle(3.2317 × 10^{616})...))) [254 triangles] ...

Using the other notation:

mega = $M(2,1,5) = M(256,256,3)$

With the function $f(x)=x^x$ we have mega = $f^{256}(256) = f^{258}(2)$ where the superscript denotes a functional power, not a numerical power.

We have (note the convention that powers are evaluated from right to left):

- $M(256,2,3) =$ $(256^{\,\!256})^{256^{256}}=256^{256^{257}}$
- $M(256,3,3) =$ $(256^{\,\!256^{257}})^{256^{256^{257}}}=256^{256^{257}\times 256^{256^{257}}}=256^{256^{257+256^{257}}}$≈$256^{\,\!256^{256^{257}}}$

Similarly:

- $M(256,4,3) \approx$ ${\,\!256^{256^{256^{256^{257}}}}}$
- $M(256,5,3) \approx$ ${\,\!256^{256^{256^{256^{256^{257}}}}}}$
- $M(256,6,3) \approx$ ${\,\!256^{256^{256^{256^{256^{256^{257}}}}}}}$

etc.

Thus:

- mega = $M(256,256,3)\approx(256\uparrow)^{256}257$, where $(256\uparrow)^{256}$ denotes a functional power of the function $f(n)=256^n$.

Rounding more crudely (replacing the 257 at the end by 256), we get mega ≈ $256\uparrow\uparrow 257$, using Knuth's up-arrow notation.

After the first few steps the value of $n^n$ is each time approximately equal to $256^n$. In fact, it is even approximately equal to $10^n$ (see also approximate arithmetic for very large numbers). Using base 10 powers we get:

- $M(256,1,3)\approx 3.23\times 10^{616}$
- $M(256,2,3)\approx10^{\,\!1.99\times 10^{619}}$ ($\log _{10} 616$ is added to the 616)
- $M(256,3,3)\approx10^{\,\!10^{1.99\times 10^{619}}}$ ($619$ is added to the $1.99\times 10^{619}$, which is negligible; therefore just a 10 is added at the bottom)
- $M(256,4,3)\approx10^{\,\!10^{10^{1.99\times 10^{619}}}}$

...

- mega = $M(256,256,3)\approx(10\uparrow)^{255}1.99\times 10^{619}$, where $(10\uparrow)^{255}$ denotes a functional power of the function $f(n)=10^n$. Hence $10\uparrow\uparrow 257 < \text{mega} < 10\uparrow\uparrow 258$

== Moser's number ==
It has been proven that in Conway chained arrow notation,

$$\mathrm{moser} < 3\rightarrow 3\rightarrow 4\rightarrow 2,$$

and, in Knuth's up-arrow notation,

$$\mathrm{moser} < f^{3}(4) = f(f(f(4))), \text{ where } f(n) = 3 \uparrow^n 3.$$

Therefore, Moser's number, although incomprehensibly large, is vanishingly small compared to Graham's number:

$$\mathrm{moser} \ll  3\rightarrow 3\rightarrow 64\rightarrow 2 < f^{64}(4) = \text{Graham's number}.$$

== See also ==
- Ackermann function
