= Rayo's number =

Claimed as largest named number

Rayo's number is a large number named after Mexican philosophy professor Agustín Rayo, who defined it during a "Big Number Duel" at the Massachusetts Institute of Technology (MIT) on 26 January 2007. At the time, it was claimed to be the largest named number, as its size vastly exceeds even other notable large numbers such as Graham's number and TREE(3).

== Definition ==
The definition of Rayo's number is a variation on the definition:

The smallest number bigger than any finite number named by an expression in any language of first-order set theory in which the language uses only a googol symbols or less.

Specifically, an initial version of the definition, which was later clarified, read "The smallest number bigger than any number that can be named by an expression in the language of first-order set-theory with less than a googol (10^{100}) symbols".

The formal definition of the number defines a predicate $\mbox{Sat}$ according to the following second-order formula, where $[\phi]$ is a Gödel-coded formula and $s$ is a variable assignment:
$$\begin{align}
\mbox{Sat}([\phi],s):=    & \mbox{For all }R \ \{ \\
& \{ \mbox{for any (coded) formula } [\psi] \mbox{ and any variable assignment } t \\
& (R([\psi],t) \leftrightarrow \\
& (( [\psi] = \mbox{“}x_i \in x_j\mbox{”} \and t(x_i) \in t(x_j)) \ \or \\
& ( [\psi] = \mbox{“}x_i = x_j\mbox{”} \and t(x_i) = t(x_j)) \ \or \\
& ( [\psi] = \mbox{“}(\neg \theta)\mbox{”} \and \neg R([\theta],t)) \ \or \\
& ( [\psi] = \mbox{“}(\theta \and \xi)\mbox{”} \and R([\theta],t) \and R([\xi],t)) \ \or \\
& ( [\psi] = \mbox{“}\exists x_i \ (\theta)\mbox{” and, for some an } x_i \mbox{-variant } t' \mbox{ of } t, R([\theta],t')) \\
& )\} \rightarrow \\
& R([\phi],s)\}
\end{align}$$

Given this formula, Rayo's number is defined as:

The smallest number bigger than every finite number $m$ with the following property: there is a formula $\phi(x_1)$ in the language of first-order set-theory (as presented in the definition of $\mbox{Sat}$) with less than a googol symbols and $x_1$ as its only free variable such that: (a) there is a variable assignment $s$ assigning $m$ to $x_1$ such that $\mbox{Sat}([\phi(x_1)],s)$, and (b) for any variable assignment $t$, if $\mbox{Sat}([\phi(x_1)],t)$, then $t$ assigns $m$ to $x_1$.

== Explanation ==
Intuitively, Rayo's number is defined in a formal language, such that:

- $x_i \in x_j$ and $x_i = x_j$ are atomic formulas.
- If $\theta$ is a formula, then $(\neg\theta)$ is a formula (the negation of $\theta$).
- If $\theta$ and $\xi$ are formulas, then $(\theta \and \xi)$ is a formula (the conjunction of $\theta$ and $\xi$).
- If $\theta$ is a formula, then $\exists x_i(\theta)$ is a formula (existential quantification).

It is not allowed to eliminate parentheses. For instance, one must write $\exists x_i((\neg \theta))$ instead of $\exists x_i(\neg \theta)$.

It is possible to express the missing logical connectives in this language. For instance:

- Disjunction: $(\theta \or \xi)$ as $(\neg((\neg \theta)\and(\neg \xi)))$.
- Implication: $(\theta \Rightarrow \xi)$ as $(\neg(\theta \and(\neg \xi)))$.
- Biconditional: $(\theta \Leftrightarrow \xi)$ as $(\neg((\neg(\theta \and \xi))\and(\neg((\neg \theta) \and (\neg \xi)))))$.
- Universal quantification: $\forall x_i(\theta)$ as $(\neg \exists x_i((\neg \theta)))$.

The definition concerns formulas in this language that have only one free variable, specifically $x_1$. If a formula with length $n$ is satisfied iff $x_1$ is equal to the finite von Neumann ordinal $k$, we say such a formula is a "Rayo string" for $k$, and that $k$ is "Rayo-nameable" in $n$ symbols. Then, $\mbox{Rayo}(10^{100})$ is defined as the smallest $k$ greater than all numbers Rayo-nameable in at most $(10^{100})$ symbols.

Rayo notes that mathematicians working with a nonrealist philosophy of math may reject Rayo's number as being well-defined, because any computably enumerable axiomatization of the language of second-order logic will have non-isomorphic models, under which Rayo's number could correspond to different values.

== See also ==
- Large numbers
- List of numbers
- Mathematical constant
- Names of large numbers
