= Asaṃkhyeya =

Sanskrit term for a large number

An asaṃkhyeya (Sanskrit: असंख्येय) is a Sanskrit word for the number 10^{140} or alternatively for the number $10^{(a\cdot2^b)}$ as it is described in the Avatamsaka Sutra. The value of the number is different depending upon the translation. It is $10^{(5\cdot2^{103})}$ in the translation of Buddhabhadra, $10^{(7\cdot2^{103})}$ in that of Shikshananda and $10^{(10\cdot2^{104})}$ in that of Thomas Cleary, who may have made an error in calculation. In these religious traditions, the word has the meaning of 'Incalculable or Countless'.

Asaṃkhyeya is a Sanskrit word that appears often in Buddhist and Hindu texts. For example:

- Shakyamuni Buddha is said to have practiced every Bodhisattva actions for 4 Asaṃkhyeya kalpas before becoming a Buddha.
- Kassapa Buddha is said to have practiced 10 perfections for 8 Asaṃkhyeya kalpas before becoming a Buddha.
- Dipankara Buddha is said to have completed 10 Pāramitās for 16 Asaṃkhyeya kalpas before becoming a Buddha..
- It is also found as names of the Hindu Gods Shiva and Vishnu in their sahasranamas respectively.

== See also ==
- History of large numbers
