= The Sand Reckoner =

Work by Archimedes

The Sand Reckoner (Arenarius)
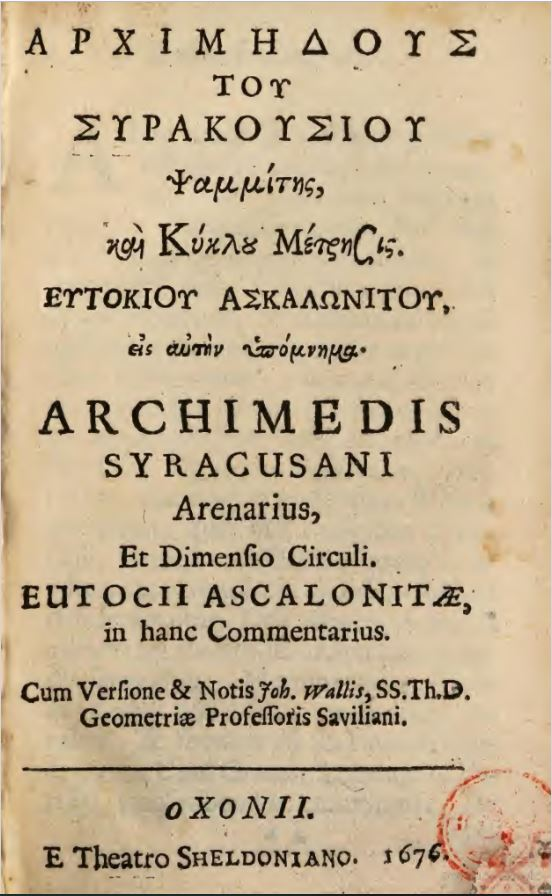
- Author: Archimedes
- Language: Greek
- Genre: Googology, Astronomy

The Sand Reckoner (Greek: Ψαμμίτης, Psammites) is a work by Archimedes, an Ancient Greek mathematician of the 3rd century BC, in which he set out to determine an upper bound for the number of grains of sand that fit into the universe. In order to do this, Archimedes had to estimate the size of the universe according to the contemporary model, and invent a way to talk about extremely large numbers.

The work, also known in Latin as Arenarius, is about eight pages long in translation and is addressed to the Syracusan king Gelo II (son of Hiero II). It is considered the most accessible work of Archimedes.

== Naming large numbers ==
Periods and orders with their intervals in modern notation
Period	Order	Interval	log_{10} of interval
1	1	(1, Ơ], where the unit of the second order, Ơ = 10^{8}	(0, 8]
1	2	(Ơ, Ơ^{2}]	(8, 16]
1	⋅⋅⋅		
1	k	(Ơ^{k − 1}, Ơ^{k}]	(8k − 8, 8k]
1	⋅⋅⋅		
1	Ơ	(Ơ^{Ơ − 1}, Ƥ], where the unit of the second period, Ƥ = Ơ^{Ơ} = 10^{8×10^{8}}	(8×10^{8} − 8, 8×10^{8}] = (799,999,992, 800,000,000]
2	1	(Ƥ, ƤƠ]	(8×10^{8}, 8 × (10^{8} + 1)] = (800,000,000, 800,000,008]
2	2	(ƤƠ, ƤƠ^{2}]	(8 × (10^{8} + 1), 8 × (10^{8} + 2)]
2	⋅⋅⋅		
2	k	(ƤƠ^{k − 1}, ƤƠ^{k}]	(8 × (10^{8} + k − 1), 8 × (10^{8} + k)]
2	⋅⋅⋅		
2	Ơ	(ƤƠ^{Ơ − 1}, ƤƠ^{Ơ}] = (Ƥ^{2}Ơ^{−1}, Ƥ^{2}]	(8 × (2×10^{8} − 1), 8 × (2×10^{8})] = (1.6×10^{9} − 8, 1.6×10^{9}] = (1,599,999,992, 1,600,000,000]
⋅⋅⋅
Ơ	1	(Ƥ^{Ơ − 1}, Ƥ^{Ơ − 1}Ơ]	(8×10^{8} × (10^{8} − 1), 8 × (10^{8} × (10^{8} − 1) + 1)] = (79,999,999,200,000,000, 79,999,999,200,000,008]
Ơ	2	(Ƥ^{Ơ − 1}Ơ, Ƥ^{Ơ − 1}Ơ^{2}]	(8 × (10^{8} × (10^{8} − 1) + 1), 8 × (10^{8} × (10^{8} − 1) + 2)]
Ơ	⋅⋅⋅		
Ơ	k	(Ƥ^{Ơ − 1}Ơ^{k − 1}, Ƥ^{Ơ − 1}Ơ^{k}]	(8 × (10^{8} × (10^{8} − 1) + k − 1), 8 × (10^{8} × (10^{8} − 1) + k)]
Ơ	⋅⋅⋅		
Ơ	Ơ	(Ƥ^{Ơ − 1}Ơ^{Ơ − 1}, Ƥ^{Ơ − 1}Ơ^{Ơ}] = (Ƥ^{Ơ}Ơ^{−1}, Ƥ^{Ơ}]	(8 × (2×10^{8} − 1), 8 × (2×10^{8})] = (8×10^{16} − 8, 8×10^{16}] = (79,999,999,999,999,992, 80,000,000,000,000,000]

First, Archimedes had to invent a system of naming large numbers. The number system in use at that time could express numbers up to a myriad (μυριάς — 10,000), and by utilizing the word myriad itself, one can immediately extend this to naming all numbers up to a myriad myriads (10^{8}). Archimedes called the numbers up to 10^{8} "first order" and called 10^{8} itself the "unit of the second order". Multiples of this unit then became the second order, up to this unit taken a myriad-myriad times, 10^{8}·10^{8}=10^{16}. This became the "unit of the third order", whose multiples were the third order, and so on. Archimedes continued naming numbers in this way up to a myriad-myriad times the unit of the 10^{8}-th order, i.e., (10^{8})^(10^{8})

After having done this, Archimedes called the orders he had defined the "orders of the first period", and called the last one, $(10^8)^{(10^8)}$, the "unit of the second period". He then constructed the orders of the second period by taking multiples of this unit in a way analogous to the way in which the orders of the first period were constructed. Continuing in this manner, he eventually arrived at the orders of the myriad-myriadth period. The largest number named by Archimedes was the last number in this period, which is

$$\left(\left(10^8\right)^{(10^8)}\right)^{(10^8)}=10^{8\cdot 10^{16}}.$$

Another way of describing this number is a one followed by (short scale) eighty quadrillion (80·10^{15}) zeroes.

Archimedes' system is reminiscent of a positional numeral system with base 10^{8}, which is remarkable because the ancient Greeks used a very simple system for writing numbers, which employs 27 different letters of the alphabet for the units 1 through 9, the tens 10 through 90 and the hundreds 100 through 900.

=== Law of exponents ===
Archimedes also discovered and proved the law of exponents, $b^m b^n = b^{m+n}$, necessary to manipulate powers of some base $b$. (Specifically, for this case, $b = 10$ for powers of 10.)

== Estimation of the size of the universe ==
Archimedes then estimated an upper bound for the number of grains of sand required to fill the Universe. To do this, he used the heliocentric model of Aristarchus of Samos. The original work by Aristarchus has been lost. This work by Archimedes however is one of the few surviving references to his theory, whereby the Sun remains unmoved while the Earth orbits the Sun. In Archimedes's own words:

His [Aristarchus'] hypotheses are that the fixed stars and the Sun remain unmoved, that the Earth revolves about the Sun on the circumference of a circle, the Sun lying in the middle of the orbit, and that the sphere of fixed stars, situated about the same center as the Sun, is so great that the circle in which he supposes the Earth to revolve bears such a proportion to the distance of the fixed stars as the center of the sphere bears to its surface.

The reason for the large size of this model is that the Greeks were unable to observe stellar parallax with available techniques, which implies that any parallax is extremely small and so the stars must be placed at great distances from the Earth (assuming heliocentrism to be true).

According to Archimedes, Aristarchus did not state how far the stars were from the Earth. Archimedes therefore had to make the following assumptions:

- The Universe was spherical
- The ratio of the diameter of the Universe to the diameter of the orbit of the Earth around the Sun equalled the ratio of the diameter of the orbit of the Earth around the Sun to the diameter of the Earth.

This assumption can also be expressed by saying that the stellar parallax caused by the motion of the Earth around its orbit equals the solar parallax caused by motion around the Earth. Put in a ratio:

$\frac{\text{Diameter of Universe}}{\text{Diameter of Earth orbit around the Sun}} = \frac{ \text{Diameter of Earth orbit around the Sun}}{ \text{ Diameter of Earth}}$

In order to obtain an upper bound, Archimedes made the following assumptions of their dimensions:

- that the circumference of the Earth was no bigger than 300 myriad stadia (5.55·10^{5} km, an over estimate by roughly a factor of 40).
- that the Moon was no larger than the Earth, and that the Sun was no more than thirty times larger than the Moon (1.65·10^{7} km, an over estimate by roughly a factor of 10)
- that the angular diameter of the Sun, as seen from the Earth, was greater than 1/200 of a right angle (π/400 radians = 0.45° degrees, an over estimate, but accurate to within 20% of the true value).

Archimedes then concluded that the diameter of the Universe was no more than 10^{14} stadia (in modern units, about 2 light years), and that it would require no more than 10^{63} grains of sand to fill it. With these measurements, each grain of sand in Archimedes's thought-experiment would have been approximately 19 μm (0.019 mm) in diameter.

=== Calculation of the number of grains of sand in the Aristarchian Universe ===
Archimedes claims that forty poppy-seeds laid side by side would equal one Greek daktylos (finger-width) which was approximately 19 mm (3/4 inch) in length. Since volume proceeds as the cube of a linear dimension ("For it has been proved that spheres have the triplicate ratio to one another of their diameters") then a sphere one dactyl in diameter would contain (using our current number system) 40^{3}, or 64,000 poppy seeds.

He then claimed (without evidence) that each poppy seed could contain a myriad (10,000) grains of sand. Multiplying the two figures together he proposed 640,000,000 as the number of hypothetical grains of sand in a sphere one dactyl in diameter.

To make further calculations easier, he rounded up 640 million to one billion, noting only that the first number is smaller than the second, and that therefore the number of grains of sand calculated subsequently will exceed the actual number of grains. Recall that Archimedes's meta-goal with this essay was to show how to calculate with what were previously considered impossibly large numbers, not simply to accurately calculate the number of grains of sand that would fit in the universe.

A Greek stadium had a length of 600 Greek feet, and each foot was 16 dactyls long, so there were 9,600 dactyls in a stadium. Archimedes rounded this number up to 10,000 (a myriad) to make calculations easier, again, noting that the resulting number will exceed the actual number of grains of sand.

The cube of 10,000 is a trillion (10^{12}); and multiplying a billion (the number of grains of sand in a dactyl-sphere) by a trillion (number of dactyl-spheres in a stadium-sphere) yields 10^{21}, the number of grains of sand in a stadium-sphere.

Archimedes had estimated that the Aristarchian Universe was 10^{14} stadia in diameter, so there would accordingly be (10^{14})^{3} stadium-spheres in the universe, or 10^{42}. Multiplying 10^{21} by 10^{42} yields 10^{63}, the number of grains of sand in the Aristarchian Universe.

Following Archimedes's estimate of a myriad (10,000) grains of sand in a poppy seed; 64,000 poppy seeds in a dactyl-sphere; the length of a stadium as 10,000 dactyls; and accepting 19mm as the width of a dactyl, the diameter of Archimedes's typical sand grain would be 18.3 μm, which today we would call a grain of silt. Currently, the smallest grain of sand would be defined as 50 μm in diameter.

=== Additional calculations ===
Archimedes made some interesting experiments and computations along the way. One experiment was to estimate the angular size of the Sun, as seen from the Earth. Archimedes's method is especially interesting as it takes into account the finite size of the eye's pupil, and therefore may be the first known example of experimentation in psychophysics, the branch of psychology dealing with the mechanics of human perception, whose development is generally attributed to Hermann von Helmholtz. Another interesting computation accounts for solar parallax and the different distances between the viewer and the Sun, whether viewed from the center of the Earth or from the surface of the Earth at sunrise. This may be the first known computation dealing with solar parallax.

== Quote ==
There are some, king Gelon, who think that the number of the sand is infinite in multitude; and I mean by the sand not only that which exists about Syracuse and the rest of Sicily but also that which is found in every region whether inhabited or uninhabited. Again there are some who, without regarding it as infinite, yet think that no number has been named which is great enough to exceed its magnitude. And it is clear that they who hold this view, if they imagined a mass made up of sand in other respects as large as the mass of the Earth, including in it all the seas and the hollows of the Earth filled up to a height equal to that of the highest of the mountains, would be many times further still from recognizing that any number could be expressed which exceeded the multitude of the sand so taken.

But I will try to show you by means of geometrical proofs, which you will be able to follow, that, of the numbers named by me and given in the work which I sent to Zeuxippus, some exceed not only the number of the mass of sand equal in magnitude to the Earth filled up in the way described, but also that of the mass equal in magnitude to the universe.

— Archimedis Syracusani Arenarius & Dimensio Circuli
