= Large numbers =

Numbers significantly larger than those used regularly

Large numbers are numbers far larger than those encountered in everyday life, such as simple counting or financial transactions. These quantities appear prominently in mathematics, cosmology, cryptography, and statistical mechanics. Googology studies the naming conventions and properties of these immense numbers.

Since the customary decimal format of large numbers can be lengthy, other systems have been devised that allows for shorter representation. For example, a billion is represented as 10 characters (1,000,000,000) in decimal format, but is only 3 characters (10^{9}) when expressed in exponential format. A trillion is 13 characters in decimal, but only four (10^{12}) in scientific notation. Values that vary dramatically can be represented and compared graphically via a logarithmic scale.

== Natural language numbering ==
A natural language numbering system represents large numbers using names rather than a series of digits. For example "billion" may be easier to comprehend for some readers than "1,000,000,000". Sometimes it is shortened by using a suffix, for example 2,340,000,000 = 2.34B (B = billion). A numeric value can be lengthy when expressed in words, for example, "2,345,789" is "two million, three hundred forty five thousand, seven hundred and eighty nine".

== Scientific notation ==
Scientific notation was devised to represent the vast range of values encountered in scientific research in a format that is more compact than traditional formats yet allows for high precision when called for. A value is represented as a decimal fraction times a multiple power of 10. The factor is intended to make reading comprehension easier than a lengthy series of zeros. For example, 1.0×10^{9} expresses one billion – 1 followed by nine zeros. The reciprocal, one billionth, is 1.0×10^{−9}. Sometimes the letter e replaces the exponent, for example 1 billion may be expressed as 1e9 instead of 1.0×10^{9}.

== Examples ==
- googol = $10^{100}$
- centillion = $10^{303}$ or $10^{600}$, depending on the number naming system
- millinillion = $10^{3003}$ or $10^{6000}$, depending on the number naming system
- The largest known Smith number = (10^{1031}−1) × (10^{4594} + 3×10^{2297} + 1)^{1476} ×10^{3913210}
- The largest known Mersenne prime = $2^{136,279,841}-1$
- googolplex = $10^{\text{googol}}=10^{10^{100}}$
- Skewes's numbers: the first is approximately $10^{10^{10^{34}}}$, the second $10^{10^{10^{964}}}$
- Graham's number, larger than what can be represented even using power towers (tetration). However, it can be represented using layers of Knuth's up-arrow notation.
- Kruskal's tree theorem is a sequence relating to graphs. TREE(3) is larger than Graham's number.
- Rayo's number is a large number named after Agustín Rayo which has been claimed to be the largest named number. It was originally defined in a "big number duel" at MIT on 26 January 2007.

Examples of large numbers describing real-world things:

- The number of cells in the human body, estimated at 3.72×10^{13}, or 37.2 trillion
- The number of bits on a computer hard disk (typically 1–2 TB as of 2024), about 10^{13}, or 10 trillion
- The number of neuronal connections in the human brain, estimated at 10^{14}, or 100 trillion
- The Avogadro constant is the number of "elementary entities" (usually atoms or molecules) in one mole; the number of atoms in 12 grams of carbon-12 – approximately 6.022×10^{23}, or 602.2 sextillion.
- The total number of DNA base pairs within the entire biomass on Earth, as a possible approximation of global biodiversity, is estimated at (5.3±3.6)×10^{37}, or 53±36 undecillion
- The Earth consists of about 4 × 10^{51}, or 4 sexdecillion, nucleons
- The estimated number of atoms in the observable universe (10^{80}), or 100 quinvigintillion
- The lower bound on the game-tree complexity of chess, also known as the "Shannon number" (estimated at 10^{120}), or 1 novemtrigintillion. Note that this value of the Shannon number is for Standard Chess. It has even larger values for larger-board chess variants such as Grant Acedrex, Tai Shogi, and Taikyoku Shogi.

== Astronomical ==
In astronomy and cosmology large numbers for measures of length and time are encountered. For instance, according to the prevailing Big Bang model, the universe is approximately 13.8 billion years old (equivalent to 4.355×10^{17} seconds). The observable universe spans 93 billion light years (approximately 8.8×10^{26} meters) and hosts around 5×10^{22} stars, organized into roughly 125 billion galaxies (as observed by the Hubble Space Telescope). As a rough estimate, there are about 10^{80} atoms within the observable universe.

According to Don Page, physicist at the University of Alberta, Canada, the longest finite time that has so far been explicitly calculated by any physicist is
$$10^{10^{10^{10^{10^{1.1}}}}} \mbox{ years}$$
(which corresponds to the scale of an estimated Poincaré recurrence time for the quantum state of a hypothetical box containing a black hole with the estimated mass of the entire universe, observable or not, assuming a certain inflationary model with an inflaton whose mass is 10^{−6} Planck masses), roughly 10^10^1.288*10^3.884 T This time assumes a statistical model subject to Poincaré recurrence. A much simplified way of thinking about this time is in a model where the universe's history repeats itself arbitrarily many times due to properties of statistical mechanics; this is the time scale when it will first be somewhat similar (for a reasonable choice of "similar") to its current state again.

Combinatorial processes give rise to astonishingly large numbers. The factorial function, which quantifies permutations of a fixed set of objects, grows superexponentially as the number of objects increases. Stirling's formula provides a precise asymptotic expression for this rapid growth.

In statistical mechanics, combinatorial numbers reach such immense magnitudes that they are often expressed using logarithms.

Gödel numbers, along with similar representations of bit-strings in algorithmic information theory, are vast—even for mathematical statements of moderate length. Remarkably, certain pathological numbers surpass even the Gödel numbers associated with typical mathematical propositions.

Logician Harvey Friedman has made significant contributions to the study of very large numbers, including work related to Kruskal's tree theorem and the Robertson–Seymour theorem.

=== "Millions and billions" ===
To help viewers of Cosmos distinguish between "millions" and "billions", astronomer Carl Sagan stressed the "b". Sagan never did, however, say "billions and billions". The public's association of the phrase and Sagan came from a Tonight Show skit. Parodying Sagan's effect, Johnny Carson quipped "billions and billions". The phrase has, however, now become a humorous fictitious number—the Sagan. Cf., Sagan Unit.

== Standardized system of writing ==
A standardized way of writing very large numbers allows them to be easily sorted in increasing order, and one can get a good idea of how much larger a number is than another one.

To compare numbers in scientific notation, say 5×10^{4} and 2×10^{5}, compare the exponents first, in this case 5 > 4, so 2×10^{5} > 5×10^{4}. If the exponents are equal, the mantissa (or coefficient) should be compared, thus 5×10^{4} > 2×10^{4} because 5 > 2.

Tetration with base 10 gives the sequence $10 \uparrow \uparrow n=10 \to n \to 2=(10\uparrow)^n 1$, the power towers of numbers 10, where $(10\uparrow)^n$ denotes a functional power of the function $f(n)=10^n$ (the function also expressed by the suffix "-plex" as in googolplex, see the googol family).

These are very round numbers, each representing an order of magnitude in a generalized sense. A crude way of specifying how large a number is, is specifying between which two numbers in this sequence it is.

More precisely, numbers in between can be expressed in the form $(10\uparrow)^n a$, i.e., with a power tower of 10s, and a number at the top, possibly in scientific notation, e.g. $10^{10^{10^{10^{10^{4.829}}}}} = (10\uparrow)^5 4.829$, a number between $10\uparrow\uparrow 5$ and $10\uparrow\uparrow 6$ (note that $10 \uparrow\uparrow n < (10\uparrow)^n a < 10 \uparrow\uparrow (n+1)$ if $1 < a < 10$). (See also extension of tetration to real heights.)

Thus googolplex is $10^{10^{100}} = (10\uparrow)^2 100 = (10\uparrow)^3 2$.

Another example:

$$2 \uparrow\uparrow\uparrow 4 =
\begin{matrix}
\underbrace{2_{}^{2^{{}^{.\,^{.\,^{.\,^2}}}}}}\\
\qquad\quad\ \ \ 65,536\mbox{ copies of }2  \end{matrix}
\approx (10\uparrow)^{65,531}(6 \times 10^{19,728}) \approx (10\uparrow)^{65,533} 4.3$$
(between $10\uparrow\uparrow 65,533$ and $10\uparrow\uparrow 65,534$)

Thus the "order of magnitude" of a number (on a larger scale than usually meant), can be characterized by the number of times (n) one has to take the $log_{10}$ to get a number between 1 and 10. Thus, the number is between $10\uparrow\uparrow n$ and $10\uparrow\uparrow (n+1)$. As explained, a more precise description of a number also specifies the value of this number between 1 and 10, or the previous number (taking the logarithm one time less) between 10 and 10^{10}, or the next, between 0 and 1.

Note that

$$10^{(10\uparrow)^{n}x}=(10\uparrow)^{n}10^x$$

I.e., if a number x is too large for a representation $(10\uparrow)^{n}x$ the power tower can be made one higher, replacing x by log_{10}x, or find x from the lower-tower representation of the log_{10} of the whole number. If the power tower would contain one or more numbers different from 10, the two approaches would lead to different results, corresponding to the fact that extending the power tower with a 10 at the bottom is then not the same as extending it with a 10 at the top (but, of course, similar remarks apply if the whole power tower consists of copies of the same number, different from 10).

If the height of the tower is large, the various representations for large numbers can be applied to the height itself. If the height is given only approximately, giving a value at the top does not make sense, so the double-arrow notation (e.g. $10\uparrow\uparrow(7.21\times 10^8)$) can be used. If the value after the double arrow is a very large number itself, the above can recursively be applied to that value.

Examples:

$10\uparrow\uparrow 10^{\,\!10^{10^{3.81\times 10^{17}}}}$ (between $10\uparrow\uparrow\uparrow 2$ and $10\uparrow\uparrow\uparrow 3$)
$10\uparrow\uparrow 10\uparrow\uparrow (10\uparrow)^{497}(9.73\times 10^{32})=(10\uparrow\uparrow)^{2} (10\uparrow)^{497}(9.73\times 10^{32})$ (between $10\uparrow\uparrow\uparrow 4$ and $10\uparrow\uparrow\uparrow 5$)

Similarly to the above, if the exponent of $(10\uparrow)$ is not exactly given then giving a value at the right does not make sense, and instead of using the power notation of $(10\uparrow)$, it is possible to add $1$ to the exponent of $(10\uparrow\uparrow)$, to obtain e.g. $(10\uparrow\uparrow)^{3} (2.8\times 10^{12})$.

If the exponent of $(10\uparrow \uparrow)$ is large, the various representations for large numbers can be applied to this exponent itself. If this exponent is not exactly given then, again, giving a value at the right does not make sense, and instead of using the power notation of $(10\uparrow \uparrow)$ it is possible use the triple arrow operator, e.g. $10\uparrow\uparrow\uparrow(7.3\times 10^{6})$.

If the right-hand argument of the triple arrow operator is large the above applies to it, obtaining e.g. $10\uparrow\uparrow\uparrow(10\uparrow\uparrow)^{2} (10\uparrow)^{497}(9.73\times 10^{32})$ (between $10\uparrow\uparrow\uparrow 10\uparrow\uparrow\uparrow 4$ and $10\uparrow\uparrow\uparrow 10\uparrow\uparrow\uparrow 5$). This can be done recursively, so it is possible to have a power of the triple arrow operator.

Then it is possible to proceed with operators with higher numbers of arrows, written $\uparrow^n$.

Compare this notation with the hyper operator and the Conway chained arrow notation:

$a\uparrow^n b$ = ( a → b → n ) = hyper(a, n + 2, b)

An advantage of the first is that when considered as function of b, there is a natural notation for powers of this function (just like when writing out the n arrows): $(a\uparrow^n)^k b$. For example:

$(10\uparrow^2)^3 b$ = ( 10 → ( 10 → ( 10 → b → 2 ) → 2 ) → 2 )

and only in special cases the long nested chain notation is reduced; for $''b'' = 1$ obtains:

$10\uparrow^3 3 = (10\uparrow^2)^3 1$ = ( 10 → 3 → 3 )

Since the b can also be very large, in general it can be written instead a number with a sequence of powers $(10 \uparrow^n)^{k_n}$ with decreasing values of n (with exactly given integer exponents ${k_n}$) with at the end a number in ordinary scientific notation. Whenever a ${k_n}$ is too large to be given exactly, the value of ${k_{n+1}}$ is increased by 1 and everything to the right of $({n+1})^{k_{n+1}}$ is rewritten.

For describing numbers approximately, deviations from the decreasing order of values of n are not needed. For example, $10 \uparrow (10 \uparrow \uparrow)^5 a=(10 \uparrow \uparrow)^6 a$, and $10 \uparrow (10 \uparrow \uparrow \uparrow 3)=10 \uparrow \uparrow (10 \uparrow \uparrow 10 + 1)\approx 10 \uparrow \uparrow \uparrow 3$. Thus is obtained the somewhat counterintuitive result that a number x can be so large that, in a way, x and 10^{x} are "almost equal" (for arithmetic of large numbers see also below).

If the superscript of the upward arrow is large, the various representations for large numbers can be applied to this superscript itself. If this superscript is not exactly given then there is no point in raising the operator to a particular power or to adjust the value on which it act, instead it is possible to simply use a standard value at the right, say 10, and the expression reduces to $10 \uparrow^n 10=(10 \to 10 \to n)$ with an approximate n. For such numbers the advantage of using the upward arrow notation no longer applies, so the chain notation can be used instead.

The above can be applied recursively for this n, so the notation $\uparrow^n$ is obtained in the superscript of the first arrow, etc., or a nested chain notation, e.g.:

(10 → 10 → (10 → 10 → $3 \times 10^5$) ) = $10 \uparrow ^{10 \uparrow ^{3 \times 10^5} 10} 10$

If the number of levels gets too large to be convenient, a notation is used where this number of levels is written down as a number (like using the superscript of the arrow instead of writing many arrows). Introducing a function $f(n)=10 \uparrow^{n} 10$ = (10 → 10 → n), these levels become functional powers of f, allowing us to write a number in the form $f^m(n)$ where m is given exactly and n is an integer which may or may not be given exactly (for example: $f^2(3 \times 10^5)$). If n is large, any of the above can be used for expressing it. The "roundest" of these numbers are those of the form f^{m}(1) = (10→10→m→2). For example, $(10 \to 10 \to 3\to 2) = 10 \uparrow ^{10 \uparrow ^{10^{10}} 10} 10$

Universe Numbers (U1 and U2)

Universe One (U₁) and Universe Two (U₂) are a pair of uncomputable large numbers coined as a thematic and mathematical extension of the Large Number Garden Number (LNGN). While LNGN represents a "garden" of massive structures, U₁ and U₂ represent the encompassing Universes in which that garden resides.

Formal Definition

Let \(\mathcal{L}_{\alpha }\) denote a formal higher-order set-theoretic language of order α, built upon ZFC extended with a transfinite hierarchy of inaccessible cardinals sufficient to guarantee the consistency of α-many iterated powerset universes.

- Universe One (U₁): The smallest positive integer strictly greater than any finite number that can be uniquely defined in the language \(\mathcal{L}_{\text{LNGN}}\) using at most LNGN symbols.
- Universe Two (U₂): The smallest positive integer strictly greater than any finite number that can be uniquely defined in the language \(\mathcal{L}_{\text{LNGN}}\) using at most U₁ symbols.

Hierarchy & Growth Rate

Because \(\mathcal{L}_{\text{LNGN}}\) diagonalizes over a transfinite hierarchy of language orders indexed by LNGN itself, both Universe numbers vastly outscale standard first-order and higher-order Rayo extensions:

\(\text{Rayo}(10^{100})\ll \text{LNGN}\ll \text{U}_{1}\ll \text{U}_{2}\)

the definition of Graham's number: it uses numbers 3 instead of 10 and has 64 arrow levels and the number 4 at the top; thus $G < 3\rightarrow 3\rightarrow 65\rightarrow 2 <(10 \to 10 \to 65\to 2)=f^{65}(1)$, but also $G < f^{64}(4)<f^{65}(1)$.

If m in $f^m(n)$ is too large to give exactly, it is possible to use a fixed n, e.g. n = 1, and apply the above recursively to m, i.e., the number of levels of upward arrows is itself represented in the superscripted upward-arrow notation, etc. Using the functional power notation of f this gives multiple levels of f. Introducing a function $g(n)=f^{n}(1)$ these levels become functional powers of g, allowing us to write a number in the form $g^m(n)$ where m is given exactly and n is an integer which may or may not be given exactly. For example, if (10→10→m→3) = g^{m}(1). If n is large any of the above can be used for expressing it. Similarly a function h, etc. can be introduced. If many such functions are required, they can be numbered instead of using a new letter every time, e.g. as a subscript, such that there are numbers of the form $f_k^m(n)$ where k and m are given exactly and n is an integer which may or may not be given exactly. Using k=1 for the f above, k=2 for g, etc., obtains (10→10→n→k) = $f_k(n)=f_{k-1}^n(1)$. If n is large any of the above can be used to express it. Thus is obtained a nesting of forms ${f_k}^{m_k}$ where going inward the k decreases, and with as inner argument a sequence of powers $(10 \uparrow^n)^{p_n}$ with decreasing values of n (where all these numbers are exactly given integers) with at the end a number in ordinary scientific notation.

When k is too large to be given exactly, the number concerned can be expressed as ${f_n}(10)$=(10→10→10→n) with an approximate n. Note that the process of going from the sequence $10^{n}$=(10→n) to the sequence $10 \uparrow^n 10$=(10→10→n) is very similar to going from the latter to the sequence ${f_n}(10)$=(10→10→10→n): it is the general process of adding an element 10 to the chain in the chain notation; this process can be repeated again (see also the previous section). Numbering the subsequent versions of this function a number can be described using functions ${f_{qk}}^{m_{qk}}$, nested in lexicographical order with q the most significant number, but with decreasing order for q and for k; as inner argument yields a sequence of powers $(10 \uparrow^n)^{p_n}$ with decreasing values of n (where all these numbers are exactly given integers) with at the end a number in ordinary scientific notation.

For a number too large to write down in the Conway chained arrow notation it size can be described by the length of that chain, for example only using elements 10 in the chain; in other words, one could specify its position in the sequence 10, 10→10, 10→10→10, .. If even the position in the sequence is a large number same techniques can be applied again.

=== Other notations ===
Some notations for extremely large numbers:

- Knuth's up-arrow notation, hyperoperators, Ackermann function, including tetration
- Conway chained arrow notation
- Steinhaus-Moser notation; apart from the method of construction of large numbers, this also involves a graphical notation with polygons. Alternative notations, like a more conventional function notation, can also be used with the same functions.
- Fast-growing hierarchy

These notations are essentially functions of integer variables, which increase very rapidly with those integers. Ever-faster-increasing functions can easily be constructed recursively by applying these functions with large integers as argument.

A function with a vertical asymptote is not helpful in defining a very large number, although the function increases very rapidly: one has to define an argument very close to the asymptote, i.e. use a very small number, and constructing that is equivalent to constructing a very large number, e.g. the reciprocal.

== Comparison of base values ==
The following illustrates the effect of a base different from 10, base 100. It also illustrates representations of numbers and the arithmetic.

$100^{12}=10^{24}$, with base 10 the exponent is doubled.

$100^{100^{12}}=10^{2*10^{24}}$, ditto.

$100^{100^{100^{12}}} \approx 10^{10^{2*10^{24}+0.30103}}$, the highest exponent is very little more than doubled (increased by log_{10}2).

- $100\uparrow\uparrow 2=10^ {200}$
- $100\uparrow\uparrow 3=10^ {2 \times 10^ {200}}$
- $100\uparrow\uparrow 4=(10\uparrow)^2 (2 \times 10^ {200}+0.3)=(10\uparrow)^2 (2\times 10^ {200})=(10\uparrow)^3 200.3=(10\uparrow)^4 2.3$
- $100\uparrow\uparrow n=(10\uparrow)^{n-2} (2 \times 10^ {200})=(10\uparrow)^{n-1} 200.3=(10\uparrow)^{n}2.3<10\uparrow\uparrow (n+1)$ (thus if n is large it seems fair to say that $100\uparrow\uparrow n$ is "approximately equal to" $10\uparrow\uparrow n$)
- $100\uparrow\uparrow\uparrow 2=(10\uparrow)^{98} (2 \times 10^ {200})=(10\uparrow)^{100} 2.3$
- $100\uparrow\uparrow\uparrow 3=10\uparrow\uparrow(10\uparrow)^{98} (2 \times 10^ {200})=10\uparrow\uparrow(10\uparrow)^{100} 2.3$
- $100\uparrow\uparrow\uparrow n=(10\uparrow\uparrow)^{n-2}(10\uparrow)^{98} (2 \times 10^ {200})=(10\uparrow\uparrow)^{n-2}(10\uparrow)^{100} 2.3<10\uparrow\uparrow\uparrow (n+1)$ (compare $10\uparrow\uparrow\uparrow n=(10\uparrow\uparrow)^{n-2}(10\uparrow)^{10}1<10\uparrow\uparrow\uparrow (n+1)$; thus if n is large it seems fair to say that $100\uparrow\uparrow\uparrow n$ is "approximately equal to" $10\uparrow\uparrow\uparrow n$)
- $100\uparrow\uparrow\uparrow\uparrow 2=(10\uparrow\uparrow)^{98}(10\uparrow)^{100} 2.3$ (compare $10\uparrow\uparrow\uparrow\uparrow 2=(10\uparrow\uparrow)^{8}(10\uparrow)^{10}1$)
- $100\uparrow\uparrow\uparrow\uparrow 3=10\uparrow\uparrow\uparrow(10\uparrow\uparrow)^{98}(10\uparrow)^{100} 2.3$ (compare $10\uparrow\uparrow\uparrow\uparrow 3=10\uparrow\uparrow\uparrow(10\uparrow\uparrow)^{8}(10\uparrow)^{10}1$)
- $100\uparrow\uparrow\uparrow\uparrow n=(10\uparrow\uparrow\uparrow)^{n-2}(10\uparrow\uparrow)^{98}(10\uparrow)^{100} 2.3$ (compare $10\uparrow\uparrow\uparrow\uparrow n=(10\uparrow\uparrow\uparrow)^{n-2}(10\uparrow\uparrow)^{8}(10\uparrow)^{10}1$; if n is large this is "approximately" equal)

== Accuracy ==
For a number $10^n$, one unit change in n changes the result by a factor 10. In a number like $10^{\,\!6.2 \times 10^3}$, with the 6.2 the result of proper rounding using significant figures, the true value of the exponent may be 50 less or 50 more. Hence the result may be a factor $10^{50}$ too large or too small. This seems like extremely poor accuracy, but for such a large number it may be considered fair (a large error in a large number may be "relatively small" and therefore acceptable).

=== For very large numbers ===
In the case of an approximation of an extremely large number, the relative error may be large, yet there may still be a sense in which one wants to consider the numbers as "close in magnitude". For example, consider

$10^{10}$ and $10^9$

The relative error is

$$1 - \frac{10^9}{10^{10}} = 1 - \frac{1}{10} = 90\%$$

a large relative error. However, one can also consider the relative error in the logarithms; in this case, the logarithms (to base 10) are 10 and 9, so the relative error in the logarithms is only 10%.

The point is that exponential functions magnify relative errors greatly – if a and b have a small relative error,

$10^a$ and $10^b$

the relative error is larger, and

$10^{10^a}$ and $10^{10^b}$

will have an even larger relative error. The question then becomes: on which level of iterated logarithms to compare two numbers? There is a sense in which one may want to consider

$10^{10^{10}}$ and $10^{10^9}$

to be "close in magnitude". The relative error between these two numbers is large, and the relative error between their logarithms is still large; however, the relative error in their second-iterated logarithms is small:

$\log_{10}(\log_{10}(10^{10^{10}})) = 10$ and $\log_{10}(\log_{10}(10^{10^9})) = 9$

Such comparisons of iterated logarithms are common, e.g., in analytic number theory.

=== Classes ===
One solution to the problem of comparing large numbers is to define classes of numbers, such as the system devised by Robert Munafo, which is based on different "levels" of perception of an average person. Class 0 – numbers between zero and six – is defined to contain numbers that are easily subitized, that is, numbers that show up very frequently in daily life and are almost instantly comparable. Class 1 – numbers between six and 1,000,000=10^{6} – is defined to contain numbers whose decimal expressions are easily subitized, that is, numbers who are easily comparable not by cardinality, but "at a glance" given the decimal expansion.

Each class after these are defined in terms of iterating this base-10 exponentiation, to simulate the effect of another "iteration" of human indistinguishability. For example, class 5 is defined to include numbers between 10^{10^{10^{10^{6}}}} and 10^{10^{10^{10^{10^{6}}}}}, which are numbers where X becomes humanly indistinguishable from X^{2} (taking iterated logarithms of such X yields indistinguishibility firstly between log(X) and 2log(X), secondly between log(log(X)) and 1+log(log(X)), and finally an extremely long decimal expansion whose length can't be subitized).

=== Approximate arithmetic ===
There are some general rules relating to the usual arithmetic operations performed on very large numbers:

- The sum and the product of two very large numbers are both "approximately" equal to the larger one.
- $(10^a)^{\,\!10^b}=10^{a 10^b}=10^{10^{b+\log _{10} a}}$

Hence:

- A very large number raised to a very large power is "approximately" equal to the larger of the following two values: the first value and 10 to the power the second. For example, for very large $n$ there is $n^n\approx 10^n$ (see e.g. the computation of mega) and also $2^n\approx 10^n$. Thus $2\uparrow\uparrow 65536 \approx 10\uparrow\uparrow 65533$, see table.

== Systematically creating ever-faster-increasing sequences ==
Given a strictly increasing integer sequence/function $f_0(n)$ (n≥1), it is possible to produce a faster-growing sequence $f_1(n) = f_0^n(n)$ (where the superscript n denotes the n^{th} functional power). This can be repeated any number of times by letting $f_k(n) = f_{k-1}^n(n)$, each sequence growing much faster than the one before it. Thus it is possible to define $f_\omega(n) = f_n(n)$, which grows much faster than any $f_k$ for finite k (here ω is the first infinite ordinal number, representing the limit of all finite numbers k). This is the basis for the fast-growing hierarchy of functions, in which the indexing subscript is extended to ever-larger ordinals.

For example, starting with f_{0}(n) = n + 1:

- f_{1}(n) = f_{0}^{n}(n) = n + n = 2n
- f_{2}(n) = f_{1}^{n}(n) = 2^{n}n > (2 ↑) n for n ≥ 2 (using Knuth up-arrow notation)
- f_{3}(n) = f_{2}^{n}(n) > (2 ↑)^{n} n ≥ 2 ↑^{2} n for n ≥ 2
- f_{k+1}(n) > 2 ↑^{k} n for n ≥ 2, k < ω
- f_{ω}(n) = f_{n}(n) > 2 ↑^{n – 1} n > 2 ↑^{n − 2} (n + 3) − 3 = A(n, n) for n ≥ 2, where A is the Ackermann function (of which f_{ω} is a unary version)
- f_{ω+1}(64) > f_{ω}^{64}(6) > Graham's number (= g_{64} in the sequence defined by g_{0} = 4, g_{k+1} = 3 ↑^{g_{k}} 3)
  - This follows by noting f_{ω}(n) > 2 ↑^{n – 1} n > 3 ↑^{n – 2} 3 + 2, and hence f_{ω}(g_{k} + 2) > g_{k+1} + 2
- f_{ω}(n) > 2 ↑^{n – 1} n = (2 → n → n-1) = (2 → n → n-1 → 1) (using Conway chained arrow notation)
- f_{ω+1}(n) = f_{ω}^{n}(n) > (2 → n → n-1 → 2) (because if g_{k}(n) = X → n → k then X → n → k+1 = g_{k}^{n}(1))
- f_{ω+k}(n) > (2 → n → n-1 → k+1) > (n → n → k)
- f_{ω2}(n) = f_{ω+n}(n) > (n → n → n) = (n → n → n→ 1)
- f_{ω2+k}(n) > (n → n → n → k)
- f_{ω3}(n) > (n → n → n → n)
- f_{ωk}(n) > (n → n → ... → n → n) (Chain of k+1 n's)
- f_{ω^{2}}(n) = f_{ωn}(n) > (n → n → ... → n → n) (Chain of n+1 n's)

== In some noncomputable sequences ==
The busy beaver function Σ is an example of a function which grows faster than any computable function. Its value for even relatively small input is huge. The values of Σ(n) for n = 1, 2, 3, 4, 5 are 1, 4, 6, 13, 4098 (sequence A028444 in the OEIS). Σ(6) is not known but is at least 10↑↑15.

== Infinite numbers ==
Although all the numbers discussed above are very large, they are all still finite. Certain fields of mathematics define infinite and transfinite numbers. For example, aleph-null is the cardinality of the infinite set of natural numbers, and aleph-one is the next greatest cardinal number. $\mathfrak{c}$ is the cardinality of the real numbers. The proposition that $\mathfrak{c} = \aleph_1$ is known as the continuum hypothesis, which cannot be proven to be either true or false from the usual axioms of set theory.

== See also ==
- Arbitrary-precision arithmetic – Calculations where numbers' precision is only limited by computer memory
- Dirac large numbers hypothesis – Hypothesis relating age of the universe to physical constants
- Exponential growth – Growth of quantities at rate proportional to the current amount
- History of large numbers
- Human scale – Concept that takes people as the primary measure of development
- Indefinite and fictitious numbers
- Indian numbering system – Indian convention of naming large numbers
- Infinity – Mathematical concept
- Law of large numbers – Averages of repeated trials converge to the expected value
- List of arbitrary-precision arithmetic software
- Long and short scales – Different meanings for numbers
- Myriad – Order of magnitude name for 10,000
- Names of large numbers
- Orders of magnitude – Scale of numbers with a fixed ratio
- Power of 10 – Ten raised to an integer power
- Power of two – Two raised to an integer power
- Tetration – Arithmetic operation
- Rayo's number, largely accepted as the largest number ever created
