= Graham's number =

Large number coined by Ronald Graham

Graham's number is an immense number that arose as an upper bound on the answer of a problem in the mathematical field of Ramsey theory. It is much larger than many other large numbers introduced as effective bounds in mathematics, such as Skewes's bound, which in turn is much larger than a googolplex. Graham's number is so large that the observable universe is far too small to contain its ordinary digital representation, assuming that each digit occupies one Planck volume. But even the number of digits in this digital representation of Graham's number would itself be a number so large that its digital representation cannot be represented in the observable universe. Nor even can the number of digits of that number—and so forth, for a number of times far exceeding the total number of Planck volumes in the observable universe. Thus, Graham's number cannot be expressed even by physical universe-scale power towers of the form $a ^{ b ^{ c ^{ \cdot ^{ \cdot ^{ \cdot}}}}}$, even though Graham's number is indeed a power of three.

However, Graham's number can be explicitly given by computable recursive formulas using Knuth's up-arrow notation or equivalent, as was done by Ronald Graham, the number's namesake. As there is a recursive formula to define it, it is much smaller than typical busy beaver numbers, the sequence of which grows faster than any computable sequence. Though too large to ever be computed in full, the sequence of digits of Graham's number can be computed explicitly via simple algorithms; the last 10 digits of Graham's number are ...2464195387. Using Knuth's up-arrow notation, Graham's number is $g_{64}$, where
$$g_n =
\begin{cases}
3\uparrow\uparrow\uparrow\uparrow3, & \text{if } n=1 \text{ and} \\
3\uparrow^{g_{n-1}}3, & \text{if } n \ge 2.
\end{cases}$$

Graham's number was used by Graham in conversations with popular science writer Martin Gardner as a simplified explanation of the upper bounds of the problem he was working on. In 1977, Gardner described the number in Scientific American, introducing it to the general public. At the time of its introduction, it was the largest specific positive integer ever to have been used in a published mathematical proof. The number was described in the 1980 Guinness Book of World Records, adding to its popular interest. Other specific integers (such as TREE(3)) known to be far larger than Graham's number have since appeared in many serious mathematical proofs, for example in connection with Harvey Friedman's various finite forms of Kruskal's theorem. Additionally, smaller upper bounds on the Ramsey theory problem from which Graham's number was derived have since been proven to be valid.

== Context ==
Example of a 2-colored 3-dimensional cube containing one single-coloured 4-vertex coplanar complete subgraph. The subgraph is shown below the cube. This cube would contain no such subgraph if, for example, the bottom edge in the present subgraph were replaced by a blue edge – thus proving by counterexample that N* > 3.

Graham's number is connected to the following problem in Ramsey theory:

Connect each pair of geometric vertices of an n-dimensional hypercube to obtain a complete graph on 2^{n} vertices. Colour each of the edges of this graph either red or blue. What is the smallest value of n for which every such colouring contains at least one single-coloured complete subgraph on four coplanar vertices?

In 1971, Graham and Rothschild proved the Graham–Rothschild theorem on the Ramsey theory of parameter words, a special case of which shows that this problem has a solution N*. They bounded the value of N* by 6 ≤ N* ≤ N, with N being a large but explicitly defined number

$$N=F^7(12) = F(F(F(F(F(F(F(12))))))),$$

where $F(n) = 2\uparrow^n 3$ in Knuth's up-arrow notation; the number is between 4 → 2 → 8 → 2 and 2 → 3 → 9 → 2 in Conway chained arrow notation. This was reduced in 2014 via upper bounds on the Hales–Jewett number to

$$N' = 2 \uparrow\uparrow (2 \uparrow\uparrow (3 + 2 \uparrow\uparrow 8)),$$

which contains three tetrations. In 2019 this was further improved to

$$N'' = (2 \uparrow\uparrow 5138) \cdot ((2 \uparrow\uparrow 5140) \uparrow\uparrow (2 \cdot 2 \uparrow\uparrow 5137)) \ll 2 \uparrow\uparrow (2 \uparrow\uparrow 5138).$$

The lower bound of 6 was later improved to 11 by Geoffrey Exoo in 2003, and to 13 by Jerome Barkley in 2008. Thus, the best known bounds for N* are 13 ≤ N* ≤ N''.

Graham's number, G, is much larger than N: it is $f^{64}(4)$, where $f(n) = 3 \uparrow^n 3$. This weaker upper bound for the problem, attributed to an unpublished work of Graham, was eventually published and named by Martin Gardner in Scientific American in November 1977.

== Publication ==
The number gained a degree of popular attention when Martin Gardner described it in the "Mathematical Games" section of Scientific American in November 1977, writing that Graham had recently established, in an unpublished proof, "a bound so vast that it holds the record for the largest number ever used in a serious mathematical proof." The 1980 Guinness Book of World Records repeated Gardner's claim, adding to the popular interest in this number. According to physicist John Baez, Graham invented the quantity now known as Graham's number in conversation with Gardner. While Graham was trying to explain a result in Ramsey theory which he had derived with his collaborator Bruce Lee Rothschild, Graham found that the said quantity was easier to explain than the actual number appearing in the proof. Because the number which Graham described to Gardner is larger than the number in the paper itself, both are valid upper bounds for the solution to the problem studied by Graham and Rothschild.

== Definition ==
Using Knuth's up-arrow notation, Graham's number G (as defined in Gardner's Scientific American article) is
$$\left.
\begin{matrix}
G &=&3\underbrace{\uparrow \uparrow \cdots \cdots \cdots \cdots \cdots \uparrow}3 \\
& &3\underbrace{\uparrow \uparrow \cdots \cdots \cdots \cdots \uparrow}3 \\
& & \underbrace{\qquad \quad \vdots \qquad \quad} \\
& &3\underbrace{\uparrow \uparrow \cdots \cdots \uparrow}3 \\
& &3\uparrow \uparrow \uparrow \uparrow3
\end{matrix}
\right \} \text{64 layers}$$

where the number of arrows in each layer is specified by the value of the next layer below it; that is,

$$G = g_{64},$$
where $g_1=3\uparrow\uparrow\uparrow\uparrow 3,$ $g_n = 3\uparrow^{g_{n-1}}3,$

and where a superscript on an up-arrow indicates how many arrows there are. In other words, G is calculated in 64 steps: the first step is to calculate g_{1} with four up-arrows between 3s; the second step is to calculate g_{2} with g_{1} up-arrows between 3s; the third step is to calculate g_{3} with g_{2} up-arrows between 3s; and so on, until finally calculating G = g_{64} with g_{63} up-arrows between 3s.

Equivalently,
$$G = f^{64}(4),\text{ where }f(n) = 3 \uparrow^n 3,$$

and the superscript on f indicates an iteration of the function, e.g., $f^4(n) = f(f(f(f(n))))$. Expressed in terms of the family of hyperoperations $\text{H}_0, \text{H}_1, \text{H}_2, \cdots$, the function f is the particular sequence $f(n) = \text{H}_{n+2}(3,3)$, which is a version of the rapidly growing Ackermann function A(n, n). (In fact, $f(n) > A(n, n)$ for all n.) The function f can also be expressed in Conway chained arrow notation as $f(n) = 3 \rightarrow 3 \rightarrow n$, and this notation also provides the following bounds on G:

$$3\rightarrow 3\rightarrow 64\rightarrow 2 < G < 3\rightarrow 3\rightarrow 65\rightarrow 2.$$

=== Magnitude ===
To convey the difficulty of appreciating the enormous size of Graham's number, it may be helpful to express—in terms of exponentiation alone—just the first term (g_{1}) of the rapidly growing 64-term sequence. First, in terms of tetration ($\uparrow\uparrow$) alone:
$$g_1
= 3 \uparrow \uparrow \uparrow \uparrow 3
= 3 \uparrow \uparrow \uparrow (3 \uparrow \uparrow \uparrow 3)
= 3 \uparrow\uparrow (3 \uparrow\uparrow (3 \uparrow\uparrow \ \dots \ (3 \uparrow\uparrow 3) \dots ))$$

where the number of 3s in the expression on the right is
$$3 \uparrow \uparrow \uparrow 3 = 3 \uparrow \uparrow (3 \uparrow \uparrow 3).$$

Now each tetration ($\uparrow\uparrow$) operation reduces to a power tower ($\uparrow$) according to the definition
$$3 \uparrow\uparrow X = 3 \uparrow (3 \uparrow (3 \uparrow \dots (3 \uparrow 3) \dots)) = 3^{3^{\cdot^{\cdot^{\cdot^{3}}}}}$$
where there are X 3s.

Thus,
$$g_1
= 3 \uparrow\uparrow (3 \uparrow\uparrow (3 \uparrow\uparrow \ \dots \ (3 \uparrow\uparrow 3) \dots ))
\quad \text{where the number of 3s is}
\quad 3 \uparrow \uparrow (3 \uparrow \uparrow 3)$$

becomes, solely in terms of repeated "exponentiation towers",
$$g_1 =
\underbrace{
\left.
\begin{matrix}3^{3^{\cdot^{\cdot^{\cdot^{\cdot^{3}}}}}}\end{matrix}
\right \}
\left.
\begin{matrix}3^{3^{\cdot^{\cdot^{\cdot^{3}}}}}\end{matrix}
\right \}
\dots
\left.
\begin{matrix}3^{3^3}\end{matrix}
\right \}
3}_{
\left.
\begin{matrix}3^{3^{\cdot^{\cdot^{\cdot^{3}}}}}\end{matrix}
\right \}
\left.
\begin{matrix}3^{3^3}\end{matrix}
\right \}
3}$$

and where the number of 3s in each tower, starting from the leftmost tower, is specified by the value of the next tower to the right.

In other words, g_{1} is computed by first calculating the number of towers, $n = 3\uparrow (3\uparrow (3\ \dots\ \uparrow 3))$ (where the number of 3s is $3\uparrow (3\uparrow 3) = 7625597484987$), and then computing the n^{th} tower in the following sequence:

- 1st tower: 3
- 2nd tower: 3↑3↑3 (number of 3s is 3) = 7625597484987
- 3rd tower: 3↑3↑3↑3↑...↑3 (number of 3s is 7625597484987) = …
- ⋮
- g_{1} = n^{th} tower: 3↑3↑3↑3↑3↑3↑3↑...↑3 (number of 3s is given by the n − 1^{th} tower)

where the number of 3s in each successive tower is given by the tower just before it. The result of calculating the third tower is the value of n, the number of towers for g_{1}.

The magnitude of this first term, g_{1}, is so large that it is practically incomprehensible, even though the above display is relatively easy to comprehend. Even n, the mere number of towers in this formula for g_{1}, is far greater than the number of Planck volumes (roughly 10^{185} of them) into which one can imagine subdividing the observable universe. And after this first term, still another 63 terms remain in the rapidly growing g sequence before Graham's number G = g_{64} is reached. To illustrate just how fast this sequence grows, while g_{1} is equal to $3 \uparrow \uparrow \uparrow \uparrow 3$ with only four up arrows, the number of up arrows in g_{2} is this incomprehensibly large number g_{1}.

== Mod n ==
The residue of Graham's number mod n, starting with n = 1, is

0, 1, 0, 3, 2, 3, 6, 3, 0, 7, 9, 3, 1, 13, 12, 11, 7, 9, 18, 7, 6, 9, 18, 3, 12, 1, 0, 27, 10, 27, 23, 27, 9, 7, 27, 27, 36, 37, 27, 27, 27, 27, 2, 31, 27, 41, 6, 27, 6, 37, …

For all values listed, and far larger values of n, sequence A240162 in the OEIS gives the residue of Graham's number modulo n. However for sufficiently large n the definition of A240162 will diverge from the residue of Graham's number modulo n.
