= Chinese numerals =

Characters used to denote numbers in Chinese

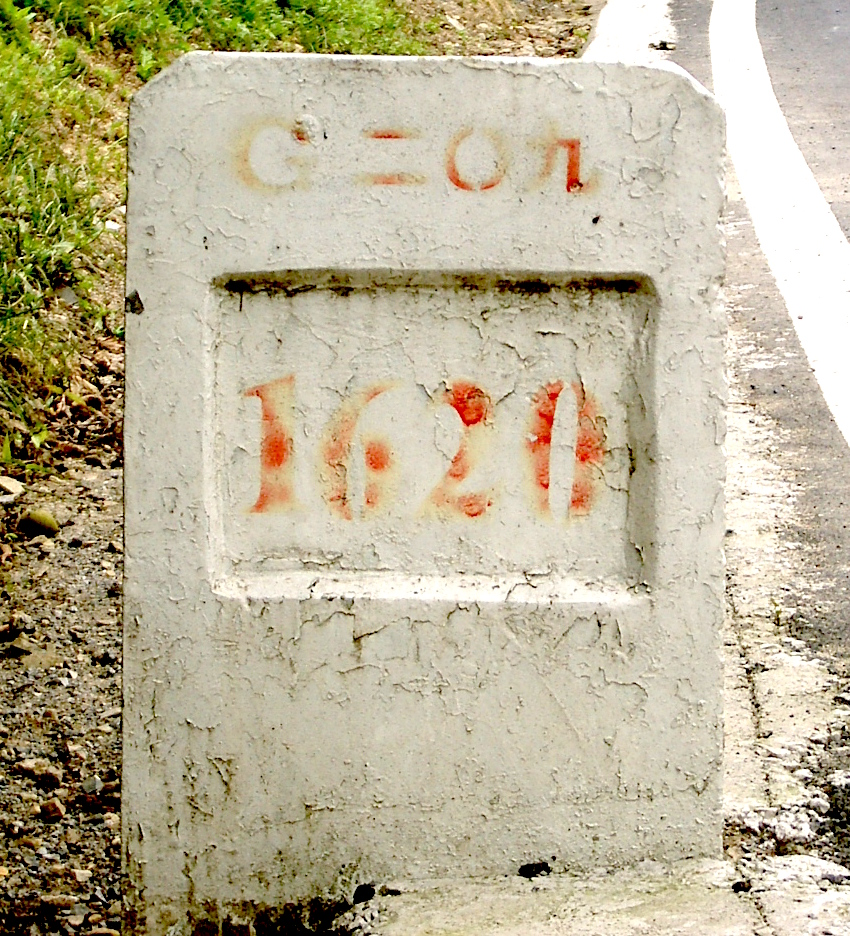
Chinese and Arabic numerals may coexist, as on this kilometer marker: 1,620 km (1,010 mi) on highway G209 (G二〇九), where "209" appears in positional notation as "二〇九", rather than the more common "二百九"

Chinese numerals are words and characters used to denote numbers in written Chinese. Speakers of Chinese languages use three written numeral systems: the international system of Arabic numerals, and two indigenous systems ('small writing' 小寫, and 'big writing' 大寫).

The more familiar indigenous system is based on Chinese characters that correspond to numerals in the spoken language. These may be shared with other languages of the Chinese cultural sphere such as Korean, Japanese, and Vietnamese. Most people and institutions in China primarily use the Arabic or mixed Arabic-Chinese systems for convenience, with traditional Chinese numerals used in finance, mainly for writing amounts on cheques, banknotes, some ceremonial occasions, some boxes, and on commercials.

The other indigenous system consists of the Suzhou numerals, or huama, a positional system, the only surviving form of the rod numerals. These were once used by Chinese mathematicians, and later by merchants in Chinese markets, such as those in Hong Kong until the 1990s, but were gradually supplanted by Arabic numerals.

== Basic counting in Chinese ==
Traditionally, the Chinese numeral system is a sign-value notation consisting of the same Chinese characters used by the Chinese written language to write spoken numbers. Similar to spelling-out numbers in English (e.g., "one thousand nine hundred forty-five"), it is not an independent system per se. Since it reflects spoken language, it generally does not use the positional system as in Arabic numerals, in the same way that spelling out numbers in English does not. In modern times, Chinese numerals may adopt a positional system in some rare contexts such as sequence numbers.

=== Ordinary numerals ===
There are characters representing the numbers zero through nine, and other characters representing powers of ten such as tens, hundreds, thousands, ten thousands and hundred millions. There are two sets of characters for ordinary Chinese numerals: one for everyday writing, known as xiǎoxiě (小寫; 小写; 'small writing'), and another for use in commercial, accounting or financial contexts, known as dàxiě (大寫; 大写; 'big writing').

==== Financial numerals ====
The financial numerals were developed by Wu Zetian (fl. 690–705) and were further refined by the Hongwu Emperor (fl. 1328–1398). They were adopted because the characters used for writing everyday numerals are geometrically simple, so simply using those numerals cannot prevent forgeries in the same way spelling numbers out in English would. A forger could easily change the characters 三十 (30) to 五千 (5000) by adding a few strokes. That would not be possible when writing using the financial characters 參拾 (30) and 伍仟 (5000). They are also referred to as "banker's numerals" or "anti-fraud numerals". For the same reason, rod numerals were never used in commercial records. Outside China, the financial numerals were adopted in Korea and in Japan for similar purposes.

Comparison of ordinary Chinese numerals
Value	Financial		Everyday		Pinyin (Mandarin)	Jyutping (Cantonese)	Tâi-lô (Hokkien)	Wugniu (Note: Wugniu is a pan-Wu romanization scheme, but the exact romanization depends on the variety. The romanization listed here is specifically for Shanghainese.) (Shanghainese)	Notes
Value	Traditional	Simplified	Traditional	Simplified	Pinyin (Mandarin)	Jyutping (Cantonese)	Tâi-lô (Hokkien)	Wugniu (Shanghainese)	Notes
0	零		零 or 〇		líng	ling4	khòng, lîng	^{6}lin	Usually 零 is preferred, but in some areas, 〇 may be a more common informal way to represent zero. 零 is more often used in schools.
1	壹		一		yī	jat1	it, tsi̍t	^{7}iq	Also 弌 (obsolete financial), can be easily manipulated into 弍; 'two' or 弎; 'three'.
2	貳	贰	二		èr	ji6	jī, nn̄g	^{6}gni, ^{6}er, ^{6}lian	Also 弍 (obsolete, financial), can be easily manipulated into 弌; 'one' or 弎; 'three'. Also 两; 兩.
3	參	叁	三		sān	saam1	sam, sann	^{1}se	Also 弎 (obsolete financial), which can be easily manipulated into 弌; 'one' or 弍; 'two'.
4	肆		四		sì	sei3	sù, sì	^{5}sy	Also 䦉 (obsolete financial). (Note: Variant Chinese character of 肆, with a 镸 radical next to a 四 character. Not all browsers may be able to display this character, which forms a part of the Unicode CJK Unified Ideographs Extension A group.)
5	伍		五		wǔ	ng5	ngóo, gōo	^{6}ng	—N/a
6	陸	陆	六		liù	luk6	liok, la̍k	^{8}loq	—N/a
7	柒		七		qī	cat1	tshit	^{7}chiq	—N/a
8	捌		八		bā	baat3	pat, peh	^{7}paq	—N/a
9	玖		九		jiǔ	gau2	kiú, káu	^{5}cieu	—N/a
10	拾		十		shí	sap6	si̍p, tsa̍p	^{8}zeq	Although some people use 什 as financial, it is not ideal because it can be easily manipulated into 伍; 'five' or 仟; 'thousand'.
100	佰		百		bǎi	baak3	pek, pah	^{7}paq	—N/a
1,000	仟		千		qiān	cin1	tshian, tshing	^{1}chi	—N/a
10^{4}	萬	万	萬	万	wàn	maan6	bān	^{6}ve	Chinese numbers group by ten-thousands; see Reading and transcribing numbers below.
10^{8}	億	亿	億	亿	yì	jik1	ik	^{5}i, ^{6}yi	—N/a
10^{12}	兆	兆	兆	兆	zhào	siu6	tiāu	^{6}zau	For variant meanings and words for higher values, see Large numbers below.

=== Regional, contextual, and historic variation ===
Variation in Chinese numerals
Financial	Normal	Value	Pinyin	Standard alternative	Notes
	空	0	kòng	零	Historically, the use of 空 for 'zero' predates 零. This is now archaic in most varieties of Chinese, but it is still used in most of Southern Min.
	洞	0	dòng	零	Literally 'a hole', is analogous to the shape of ⟨0⟩ and ⟨〇⟩, it is used to unambiguously pronounce 0 in radio communication.
	幺; 么	1	yāo	一	Literally 'the smallest', it is used to unambiguously pronounce 1 in radio communication. This usage is not observed in Cantonese except for 十三幺, which refers to a special winning hand in mahjong.
	蜀	1	shǔ	一	In most Min varieties, there are two words meaning 'one'. For example, in Hokkien, chi̍t is used before a classifier: 'one person' is chi̍t ê lâng, not it ê lâng. In written Hokkien, 一 is often used for both chi̍t and it, but some authors differentiate, writing 蜀 for chi̍t and 一 for it.
	两; 兩	2	liǎng	二	Used instead of 二 before a classifier. For example, 'two people' is 两个人, not 二个人. However, in some dialects such as Shanghainese, 兩 is the generic term used for two in most contexts, such as 四十兩 and not 四十二. It appears where 'a pair of' might in English, but 两 is always used in such cases. It is also used for numbers, with usage varying from dialect to dialect, even person to person. For example, '2222' can be read as 二千二百二十二, 兩千二百二十二, or even 兩千兩百二十二 in Mandarin. It is used to unambiguously pronounce 2 in radio communication.
	俩; 倆	2	liǎ	兩	In regional dialects of Northeastern Mandarin, 倆 represents a "lazy" pronunciation of 兩 within the local dialect. It can be used as an alternative for 兩个; 'two of', e.g. 我们倆; wǒmen liǎ; 'the two of us', as opposed to 我们兩个; wǒmen liǎng gè. A measure word never follows 倆.
	仨	3	sā	三	In regional dialects of Northeastern Mandarin, 仨 represents a "lazy" pronunciation of three within the local dialect. It can be used as a general number to represent 'three', e.g.第仨号; dìsāhào; 'number three'; or as an alternative for 三个; 'three of', e.g. 我们仨; wǒmen sā; 'the three of us', as opposed to 我们三个; wǒmen sān gè). A measure word never follows 仨.
	拐	7	guǎi	七	Literally 'a turn' or 'a walking stick' and is analogous to the shape of ⟨7⟩ and 七, it is used to unambiguously pronounce 7 in radio communication.
	勾	9	gōu	九	Literally 'a hook' and is analogous to the shape of ⟨9⟩, it is used to unambiguously pronounce 9 in radio communication.
	呀	10	yà	十	In spoken Cantonese, 呀 (aa6) can be used in place of 十 when it is used in the middle of a number, preceded by a multiplier and followed by a ones digit, e.g. 六呀三 '63', it is not used by itself to mean 10. This usage is not observed in Mandarin.
念	廿	20	niàn	二十	A contraction of 二十. The written form is still used to refer to dates, especially Chinese calendar dates. Spoken form is still used in various dialects of Chinese. See Reading and transcribing numbers section below. In spoken Cantonese, 廿 (jaa6) can be used in place of 二十 when followed by another digit such as in the numbers 21–29, e.g. 廿三 '23'; a measure word, e.g. 廿個; a noun, or in a phrase like 廿幾 'twenty-something'. It is not used by itself to mean 20. 廿; jiāp/gnie6 is still used in place of 二十 in Southern Min and Wu. 卄 is a rare variant.
	卅	30	sà	三十	A contraction of 三十. The written form is still used to abbreviate date references in Chinese. For example, May 30 Movement (五卅運動). The spoken form is still used in various dialects of Chinese. In spoken Cantonese, 卅; saa1 can be used in place of 三十 when followed by another digit such as in numbers 31–39, a measure word (e.g. 卅個), a noun, or in phrases like 卅幾 'thirty-something'. It is not used by itself to mean 30. When spoken 卅 is pronounced as 卅呀; saa1-aa6. Thus 卅一 '31', is pronounced as saa1-aa6-jat1.
	卌	40	xì	四十	A contraction of 四十. Found in historical writings written in Literary Chinese. Spoken form is still used in various dialects of Chinese, albeit very rare. See Reading and transcribing numbers section below. In spoken Cantonese 卌; sei3 can be used in place of 四十 when followed by another digit such as in numbers 41–49, a measure word (e.g. 卌個), a noun, or in phrases like 卌幾 'forty-something', it is not used by itself to mean 40. When spoken, 卌 is pronounced as 卌呀; sei3-aa6. Thus 卌一; 41, is pronounced as sei3-aa6-jat1. Similarly, in Southern Min 41 can be referred to as 卌一; siap it.
	皕	200	bì	二百	Very rarely used; one example is in the name of a library in Huzhou, 皕宋樓; Bìsòng Lóu.

== Powers of 10 ==
=== Large numbers ===
For numbers larger than 10,000, similarly to the long and short scales in the West, there have been four systems in ancient and modern usage. The original one, with unique names for all powers of ten up to the 14th, is ascribed to the Yellow Emperor in the 6th century book by Zhen Luan, Wujing suanshu; 'Arithmetic in Five Classics'. In modern Chinese, only the second system is used, in which the same ancient names are used, but each represents a myriad, 萬; wàn times the previous:

Character	萬	億	兆	京	垓	秭	穰	溝	澗	正	載	Factor of increase
Character (Simplified)	万	亿	兆	京	垓	秭	穰	沟	涧	正	载	Factor of increase
Pinyin	wàn	yì	zhào	jīng	gāi	zǐ	rǎng	gōu	jiàn	zhèng	zǎi	Factor of increase
Jyutping	maan6	jik1	siu6	ging1	goi1	zi2	joeng5	kau1	gaan3	zing3	zoi2	Factor of increase
Tai Lo	bān	ik	tiāu	king	kai	cí	jiông	koo	kàn	cèng	cáinn	Factor of increase
Wugniu	^{6}ve	^{6}yi	^{6}zau	^{1}cin	^{1}ke	^{3}tsy	^{4}gnian	^{1}keu	^{5}ke	^{5}tsen	^{5}tse	Factor of increase
Alternative				经; 經		𥝱	壤					
Rank	1	2	3	4	5	6	7	8	9	10	11	=n
"short scale" (下數)	10^{4}	10^{5}	10^{6}	10^{7}	10^{8}	10^{9}	10^{10}	10^{11}	10^{12}	10^{13}	10^{14}	=10^{n+3} Each numeral is 10 (十; shí) times the previous.
"myriad scale" (萬進, current usage)	10^{4}	10^{8}	10^{12}	10^{16}	10^{20}	10^{24}	10^{28}	10^{32}	10^{36}	10^{40}	10^{44}	=10^{4n} Each numeral is 10,000 (万; 萬; wàn) times the previous.
"mid-scale" (中數)	10^{4}	10^{8}	10^{16}	10^{24}	10^{32}	10^{40}	10^{48}	10^{56}	10^{64}	10^{72}	10^{80}	=10^{8(n-1)} Starting with 亿, each numeral is 10^{8} (万乘以万; 萬乘以萬; wàn chéngyǐ wàn; '10000 times 10000') times the previous.
"long scale" (上數)	10^{4}	10^{8}	10^{16}	10^{32}	10^{64}	10^{128}	10^{256}	10^{512}	10^{1024}	10^{2048}	10^{4096}	=10^{2^{n+1}} Each numeral is the square of the previous. This is similar to the -yllion system.

In practice, this situation does not lead to ambiguity, with the exception of 兆; zhào, which means 10^{12} according to the system in common usage throughout Chinese communities as well as in Japan and Korea, but has also been used for 10^{6} in recent years (especially in mainland China for megabyte). To avoid ambiguity, the PRC government never uses this character in official documents, but uses 万亿; wànyì or 太; tài; 'tera-' instead. Partly due to this, combinations of 万 and 亿 are often used instead of the larger units of the traditional system as well, for example 亿亿; yìyì instead of 京. The ROC government in Taiwan uses 兆; zhào to mean 10^{12} in official documents.

=== Large numbers from Buddhism ===
Numerals beyond 載 zǎi come from Buddhist texts in Sanskrit, but are mostly found in ancient texts. Some of the following words are still being used today, but may have transferred meanings.

Character	Pinyin	Jyutping	Tai Lo	Shanghainese	Value	Notes
极; 極	jí	gik6	ke̍k	jiq^{8}	10^{48}	Literally 'extreme'.
恒河沙; 恆河沙	héng hé shā	hang4 ho4 saa1	hîng-hô-sua	ghen^{2}-wu-so	10^{52}	Literally 'sands of the Ganges', a metaphor used in a number of Buddhist texts referring to many individual grains of sand
阿僧祇	ā sēng qí	aa1 zang1 kei4	a-sing-kî	a^{1}-sen-ji	10^{56}	From Sanskrit Asaṃkhyeya असंख्येय 'innumerable', 'infinite'
那由他	nà yóu tā	naa5 jau4 taa1	ná-iû-thann	na^{1}-yeu-tha	10^{60}	From Sanskrit nayuta नियुत 'myriad'
不可思議; 不可思议	bùkě sīyì	bat1 ho2 si1 ji3	put-khó-su-gī	peq^{7}-khu sy^{1}-gni	10^{64}	Literally translated as "unfathomable". This word is commonly used in Chinese as a chengyu, meaning "unimaginable", instead of its original meaning of the number 10^{64}.
无量大数; 無量大數	wú liàng dà shù	mou4 loeng6 daai6 sou3	bû-liōng tāi-siàu	m^{6}-lian du^{6}-su	10^{68}	无量 literally 'without measure', and can mean 10^{68}. This word is also commonly used in Chinese as a commendatory term, means 'no upper limit'. e.g.: 前途无量 'a great future'. 大数 'a large number', and can mean 10^{72}.

=== Small numbers ===
The following are characters used to denote small order of magnitude in Chinese historically. With the introduction of SI units, some of them have been incorporated as SI prefixes, while the rest have fallen into disuse.

Characters	Pinyin	Value	Notes
漠	mò	10^{−12}	(Ancient Chinese) Replaced by 皮 for the SI prefix pico-.
渺	miǎo	10^{−11}	(Ancient Chinese)
埃	āi	10^{−10}	(Ancient Chinese)
尘; 塵	chén	10^{−9}	Literally 'dust' Replaced by 纳; 奈 for the SI prefix nano-.
沙	shā	10^{−8}	Literally, "Sand"
纤; 纖	xiān	10^{−7}	'fiber'
微	wēi	10^{−6}	still used, corresponds to the SI prefix micro-.
忽	hū	10^{−5}	(Ancient Chinese)
丝; 絲	sī	10^{−4}	also 秒. Literally, "Thread"
毫	háo	10^{−3}	also 毛. still in use, corresponds to the SI prefix milli-.
厘; 釐	lí	10^{−2}	still in use, corresponds to the SI prefix centi-.
分	fēn	10^{−1}	still in use, corresponds to the SI prefix deci-.

=== Small numbers from Buddhism ===
Characters	Pinyin	Value	Notes
涅槃寂静; 涅槃寂靜	niè pán jì jìng	10^{−24}	'Nirvana's tranquillity' Replaced by 幺; 攸 for the SI prefix yocto-.
阿摩罗; 阿摩羅	ā mó luó	10^{−23}	From Sanskrit अमल amala
阿赖耶; 阿頼耶	ā lài yē	10^{−22}	From Sanskrit आलय ālaya
清静; 清靜	qīng jìng	10^{−21}	'quiet' Replaced by 仄; 介 for the SI prefix zepto-.
虚空; 虛空	xū kōng	10^{−20}	'void'
六德	liù dé	10^{−19}	Literally 'six virtues'
刹那; 剎那	chà nà	10^{−18}	Literally 'brevity', from Sanskrit क्षण ksaṇa. Replaced by 阿 for SI prefix atto-.
弹指; 彈指	tán zhǐ	10^{−17}	Literally 'flick of a finger'. Still commonly used in the phrase 弹指一瞬间; 'a very short time'
瞬息	shùn xī	10^{−16}	Literally 'moment of breath'. Still commonly used in the chengyu 瞬息万变 'many things changed in a very short time'
须臾; 須臾	xū yú	10^{−15}	Rarely used in modern Chinese as 'a very short time'. Replaced by 飞; 飛 for the SI prefix femto-.
逡巡	qūn xún	10^{−14}	'hesitation'
模糊	mó hu	10^{−13}	'blurred'

=== SI prefixes ===
In the People's Republic of China, the early translation for the SI prefixes in 1981 was different from those used today. The larger (兆, 京, 垓, 秭, 穰) and smaller Chinese numerals (微, 纖, 沙, 塵, 渺) were defined as translation for the SI prefixes as mega, giga, tera, peta, exa, micro, nano, pico, femto, atto, resulting in the creation of yet more values for each numeral.

The Republic of China (Taiwan) defined 百萬 as the translation for mega and 兆 as the translation for tera. This translation is widely used in official documents, academic communities, informational industries, etc. However, the civil broadcasting industries sometimes use 兆赫 to represent "megahertz".

Today, the governments of both China and Taiwan use phonetic transliterations for the SI prefixes. However, the governments have chosen different Chinese characters for certain prefixes. The following table lists the two different standards together with the early translation.

SI prefixes
Value	Symbol	English	Early translation		PRC standard		ROC standard	
10^{30}	Q	quetta-			昆	kūn	昆	kūn
10^{27}	R	ronna-			容	róng	羅	luó
10^{24}	Y	yotta-			尧	yáo	佑	yòu
10^{21}	Z	zetta-			泽	zé	皆	jiē
10^{18}	E	exa-	穰	ráng	艾	ài	艾	ài
10^{15}	P	peta-	秭	zǐ	拍	pāi	拍	pāi
10^{12}	T	tera-	垓	gāi	太	tài	兆	zhào
10^{9}	G	giga-	京	jīng	吉	jí	吉	jí
10^{6}	M	mega-	兆	zhào	兆	zhào	百萬	bǎiwàn
10^{3}	k	kilo-	千	qiān	千	qiān	千	qiān
10^{2}	h	hecto-	百	bǎi	百	bǎi	百	bǎi
10^{1}	da	deca-	十	shí	十	shí	十	shí
10^{0}	(base)	one			一	yī	一	yī
10^{−1}	d	deci-	分	fēn	分	fēn	分	fēn
10^{−2}	c	centi-	厘	lí	厘	lí	厘	lí
10^{−3}	m	milli-	毫	háo	毫	háo	毫	háo
10^{−6}	μ	micro-	微	wēi	微	wēi	微	wēi
10^{−9}	n	nano-	纖	xiān	纳	nà	奈	nài
10^{−12}	p	pico-	沙	shā	皮	pí	皮	pí
10^{−15}	f	femto-	塵	chén	飞	fēi	飛	fēi
10^{−18}	a	atto-	渺	miǎo	阿	à	阿	à
10^{−21}	z	zepto-			仄	zè	介	jiè
10^{−24}	y	yocto-			幺	yāo	攸	yōu
10^{−27}	r	ronto-			柔	róu	絨	róng
10^{−30}	q	quecto-			亏	kuī	匱	kuì

=== Non-SI metric prefixes ===
Two additional non-SI power-of-ten prefixes were translated in a 1959 PRC standard for length units:

Non-SI prefixes
Value	Symbol	English	PRC 1959 translation	
10^{−5}	cm	centimilli-	忽	hū
10^{−4}	dm	decimilli-	丝	sī

These are derived from the traditional small number prefixes. They are not seen in newer standards but nevertheless has surviving uses.

== Reading and transcribing numbers ==
=== Whole numbers ===
Multiple-digit numbers are constructed using a multiplicative principle; first the digit itself (from 1 to 9), then the place (such as 10 or 100); then the next digit.

In Mandarin, 兩 (liǎng) rather than 二; èr is often used for all numbers 200 and greater to represent the "2" numeral (although as noted earlier this varies from dialect to dialect and person to person). Use of both 兩; liǎng or 二; èr are acceptable for the number 200. When writing in the Cantonese dialect, 二; yi^{6} is used to represent the "2" numeral for all numbers. In the southern Min dialect of Chaozhou (Teochew), 兩 (no^{6}) is used to represent the "2" numeral in all numbers from 200 onwards. Thus:

Number	Structure	Characters			
Number	Structure	Mandarin	Cantonese	Chaozhou	Shanghainese
60	[6] [10]	六十	六十	六十	六十
20	[2] [10] or [20]	二十	二十 or 廿	二十	廿
200	[2] (èr or liǎng) [100]	二百 or 两百	二百 or 兩百	兩百	兩百
2000	[2] (èr or liǎng) [1000]	二千 or 两千	二千 or 兩千	兩千	兩千
45	[4] [10] [5]	四十五	四十五 or 卌五	四十五	四十五
2,362	[2] [1000] [3] [100] [6] [10] [2]	两千三百六十二	二千三百六十二	兩千三百六十二	兩千三百六十二

For the numbers 11 through 19, the leading 'one' (一; yī) is usually omitted. In some dialects, like Shanghainese, when there are only two significant digits in the number, the leading 'one' and the trailing zeroes are omitted. Sometimes, the one before "ten" in the middle of a number, such as 213, is omitted. Typically, however, when 十 would otherwise be preceded by 百, 一 is added to precede 十. Thus:

Number	Strict Putonghua		Colloquial or dialect usage	
Number	Structure	Characters	Structure	Characters
14	[10] [4]	十四		
12000	[1] [10000] [2] [1000]	一萬兩千	[1] [10000] [2]	一萬二 or 萬二
114	[1] [100] [1] [10] [4]	一百一十四	[1] [100] [10] [4]	一百十四
1158	[1] [1000] [1] [100] [5] [10] [8]	一千一百五十八		

(Nothing is ever omitted in large and complicated numbers such as these.)

In certain older texts like the Protestant Bible, or in poetic usage, numbers such as 114 may be written as [100] [10] [4] (百十四).

Outside of Taiwan, digits are sometimes grouped by myriads instead of thousands. Hence it is more convenient to think of numbers here as in groups of four, thus 1,234,567,890 is regrouped here as 12,3456,7890. Larger than a myriad, each number is therefore four zeroes longer than the one before it, thus 10000 × 萬; wàn = 億; yì. If one of the numbers is between 10 and 19, the leading 'one' is omitted as per the above point. Hence (numbers in parentheses indicate that the number has been written as one number rather than expanded):

Number	Structure	Taiwan	Mainland China
12,345,678,902,345 (12,3456,7890,2345)	(12) [1,0000,0000,0000] (3456) [1,0000,0000] (7890) [1,0000] (2345)	十二兆三千四百五十六億七千八百九十萬兩千三百四十五	十二兆三千四百五十六亿七千八百九十万二千三百四十五

In Taiwan, pure Arabic numerals are officially always and only grouped by thousands. Unofficially, they are often not grouped, particularly for numbers below 100,000. Mixed Arabic-Chinese numerals are often used in order to denote myriads. This is used both officially and unofficially, and come in a variety of styles:

Number	Structure	Mixed numerals
12,345,000	(1234) [1,0000] (5) [1000]	1,234萬5千
123,450,000	(1) [1,0000,0000] (2345) [1,0000]	1億2345萬
12,345	(1) [1,0000] (2345)	1萬2345

Interior zeroes before the unit position (as in 1002) must be spelt explicitly. The reason for this is that trailing zeroes (as in 1200) are often omitted as shorthand, so ambiguity occurs. One zero is sufficient to resolve the ambiguity. Where the zero is before a digit other than the units digit, the explicit zero is not ambiguous and is therefore optional, but preferred. Thus:

Number	Structure	Characters
205	[2] [100] [0] [5]	二百零五
100,004(10,0004)	[10] [10,000] [0] [4]	十萬零四
10,050,026(1005,0026)	(1005) [10,000] (026) or (1005) [10,000] (26)	一千零五萬零二十六 or 一千零五萬二十六

=== Fractional values ===
To construct a fraction, the denominator is written first, followed by 分; fēn; 'part', then the literary possessive particle 之; zhī; 'of this', and lastly the numerator. Each half of the fraction is written the same as a whole number. For example, to express "two thirds", the structure "three parts of-this two" is used. Mixed numbers are written with the whole-number part first, followed by 又; yòu; 'and', then the fractional part.

Fraction	Structure
2/3	三 分 之 二 sān fēn zhī èr 3 parts {of this} 2
15/32	三 十 二 分 之 十 五 sān shí èr fēn zhī shí wǔ 3 10 2 parts {of this} 10 5
1/3000	三 千 分 之 一 sān qiān fēn zhī yī 3 1000 parts {of this} 1
3 5/6	三 又 六 分 之 五 sān yòu liù fēn zhī wǔ 3 and 6 parts {of this} 5

Percentages are constructed similarly, using 百; bǎi; '100' as the denominator. (The number 100 is typically expressed as 一百; yībǎi; 'one hundred', like the English 'one hundred'. However, for percentages, 百 is used on its own.)

Percentage	Structure
25%	百 分 之 二 十 五 bǎi fēn zhī èr shí wǔ 100 parts {of this} 2 10 5
110%	百 分 之 一 百 一 十 bǎi fēn zhī yī bǎi yī shí 100 parts {of this} 1 100 1 10

Because percentages and other fractions are formulated the same, Chinese are more likely than not to express 10%, 20% etc. as 'parts of 10' (or 1/10, 2/10, etc. i.e. 十分之一; shí fēnzhī yī, 十分之二; shí fēnzhī èr, etc.) rather than "parts of 100" (or 10/100, 20/100, etc. i.e. 百分之十; bǎi fēnzhī shí, 百分之二十; bǎi fēnzhī èrshí, etc.)

In Taiwan, the most common formation of percentages in the spoken language is the number per hundred followed by the word 趴; pā, a contraction of the Japanese パーセント; pāsento, itself taken from 'percent'. Thus 25% is 二十五趴; èrshíwǔ pā. (Note: This usage can also be found in written sources, such as in the headline of this article (while the text uses "%") and throughout this article.)

Decimal numbers are constructed by first writing the whole number part, then inserting a point (点; 點; diǎn), and finally the fractional part. The fractional part is expressed using only the numbers for 0 to 9, similarly to English.

Decimal expression	Structure
16.98	十 六 點 九 八 shí liù diǎn jiǔ bā 10 6 point 9 8
12345.6789	一 萬 兩 千 三 百 四 十 五 點 六 七 八 九 yī wàn liǎng qiān sān bǎi sì shí wǔ diǎn liù qī bā jiǔ 1 10000 2 1000 3 100 4 10 5 point 6 7 8 9
75.4025	七 十 五 點 四 〇 二 五 七 十 五 點 四 零 二 五 qī shí wǔ diǎn sì líng èr wǔ 7 10 5 point 4 0 2 5
0.1	零 點 一 líng diǎn yī 0 point 1

半; bàn; 'half' functions as a number and therefore requires a measure word. For example: 半杯水; bàn bēi shuǐ; 'half a glass of water'.

=== Ordinal numbers ===
Ordinal numbers are formed by adding 第; dì; 'sequence' before the number.

Ordinal	Structure
1st	第 一 dì yī sequence 1
2nd	第 二 dì èr sequence 2
82nd	第 八 十 二 dì bā shí èr sequence 8 10 2

The Heavenly Stems are a traditional Chinese ordinal system.

=== Negative numbers ===
Negative numbers are formed by adding 负; 負; fù before the number.

Number	Structure
−1158	負 一 千 一 百 五 十 八 fù yī qiān yī bǎi wǔ shí bā negative 1 1000 1 100 5 10 8
−3 5/6	負 三 又 六 分 之 五 fù sān yòu liù fēn zhī wǔ negative 3 and 6 parts {of this} 5
−75.4025	負 七 十 五 點 四 零 二 五 fù qī shí wǔ diǎn sì líng èr wǔ negative 7 10 5 point 4 0 2 5

=== Usage ===
Chinese grammar requires the use of classifiers (measure words) when a numeral is used together with a noun to express a quantity. For example, "three people" is expressed as 三个人; 三個人; sān ge rén, "three (ge particle) person", where 个/個 ge is a classifier. There exist many different classifiers, for use with different sets of nouns, although 个/個 is the most common, and may be used informally in place of other classifiers.

Chinese uses cardinal numbers in certain situations in which English would use ordinals. For example, 三楼/三樓; sān lóu (literally "three story/storey") means "third floor" ("second floor" in British § Numbering). Likewise, 二十一世纪/二十一世紀; èrshí yī shìjì (literally "twenty-one century") is used for "21st century".

Numbers of years are commonly spoken as a sequence of digits, as in 二零零一; èr líng líng yī ("two zero zero one") for the year 2001. Names of months and days (in the Western system) are also expressed using numbers: 一月; yīyuè ("one month") for January, etc.; and 星期一; xīngqīyī ("week one") for Monday, etc. There is only one exception: Sunday is 星期日; xīngqīrì, or informally 星期天; xīngqītiān, both literally "week day". When meaning "week", "星期" xīngqī and "禮拜; 礼拜" lǐbài are interchangeable. "禮拜天" lǐbàitiān or "禮拜日" lǐbàirì means "day of worship". Chinese Catholics call Sunday "主日" zhǔrì, "Lord's day".

Full dates are usually written in the format 2001年1月20日 for January 20, 2001 (using 年; nián "year", 月; yuè "month", and 日; rì "day") – all the numbers are read as cardinals, not ordinals, with no leading zeroes, and the year is read as a sequence of digits. For brevity the nián, yuè and rì may be dropped to give a date composed of just numbers. For example "6-4" in Chinese is "six-four", short for "month six, day four" i.e. June Fourth, a common Chinese shorthand for the 1989 Tiananmen Square protests and massacre (because of the violence that occurred on June 4). For another example 67, in Chinese is sixty seven, short for year nineteen sixty seven, a common Chinese shorthand for the 1967 Hong Kong riots.

== Counting rod and Suzhou numerals ==
Counting rod numerals

In the same way that Roman numerals were standard in ancient and medieval Europe for mathematics and commerce, the Chinese formerly used the rod numerals, which is a positional system. The Suzhou numerals (simplified Chinese: 苏州花码; traditional Chinese: 蘇州花碼; pinyin: Sūzhōu huāmǎ) system is a variation of the Southern Song rod numerals. Nowadays, the huāmǎ system is only used for displaying prices in Chinese markets or on traditional handwritten invoices.

== Hand gestures ==
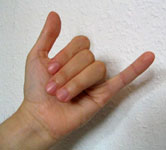
Hand symbol for the number six

There is a common method of using of one hand to signify the numbers one to ten. While the five digits on one hand can easily express the numbers one to five, six to ten have special signs that can be used in commerce or day-to-day communication.

== Historical use of numerals in China ==
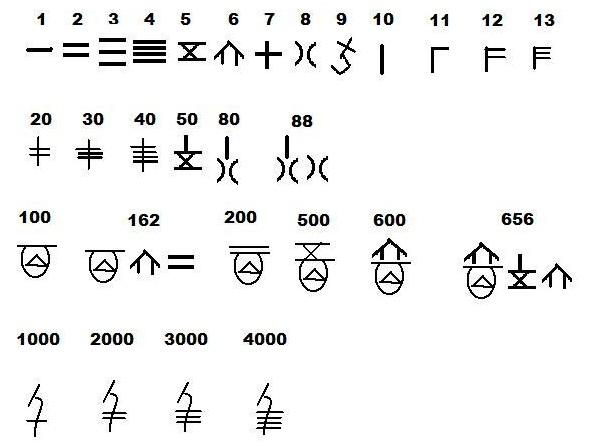
Shang oracle bone numerals of 14th century B.C.

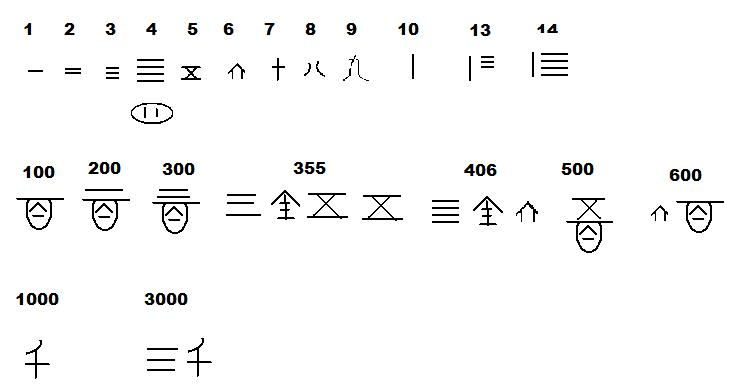
West Zhou dynasty bronze script

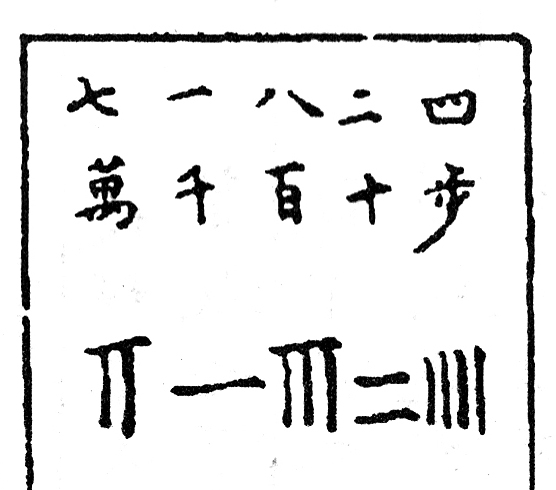
Counting rod numeral example from the Yongle Encyclopedia showing the number 71,824

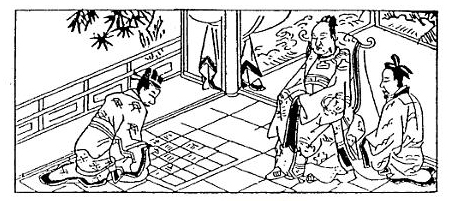
Japanese counting board with grids

Most Chinese numerals of later periods were descendants of the Shang dynasty oracle numerals of the 14th century BC. The oracle bone script numerals were found on tortoise shell and animal bones. In early civilizations, the Shang were able to express any numbers, however large, with only nine symbols and a counting board though it was still not positional.

Some of the bronze script numerals such as 1, 2, 3, 4, 10, 11, 12, and 13 became part of the system of rod numerals.

In this system, horizontal rod numbers are used for the tens, thousands, hundred thousands etc. It is written in Sunzi Suanjing that "one is vertical, ten is horizontal".

七	一	八	二	四
7	1	8	2	4

The counting rod numerals system has place value and decimal numerals for computation, and was used widely by Chinese merchants, mathematicians and astronomers from the Han dynasty to the 16th century.

Alexander Wylie, Christian missionary to China, in 1853 already refuted the notion that "the Chinese numbers were written in words at length", and stated that in ancient China, calculation was carried out by means of counting rods, and "the written character is evidently a rude presentation of these". After being introduced to the rod numerals, he said "Having thus obtained a simple but effective system of figures, we find the Chinese in actual use of a method of notation depending on the theory of local value [i.e. place-value], several centuries before such theory was understood in Europe, and while yet the science of numbers had scarcely dawned among the Arabs."

During the Ming and Qing dynasties (after Arabic numerals were introduced into China), some Chinese mathematicians used Chinese numeral characters as positional system digits. After the Qing period, both the Chinese numeral characters and the Suzhou numerals were replaced by Arabic numerals in mathematical writings.

== Cultural influences ==
Traditional Chinese numeric characters are also used in Japan and Korea and were used in Vietnam before the 20th century. In vertical text, using characters for numbers is the norm, while in horizontal text, Arabic numerals are most common. Chinese numeric characters are also used in much the same formal or decorative fashion that Roman numerals are in Western cultures. Chinese numerals may appear together with Arabic numbers on the same sign or document.

== See also ==
- Numbers in Chinese culture
