= Chinese date =

Chinese date can refer to:

== Calendar dates ==
- Traditional Chinese calendar dates
- Modern expression of dates in Chinese

== Fruit trees ==
- Species of Ziziphus, particularly:
  - Ziziphus jujuba
  - Ziziphus mauritiana
