= Japanese numerals =

Number words used in the Japanese language

The Japanese numerals (数詞, sūshi) are numerals that are used in Japanese. In writing, they are the same as the Chinese numerals, and large numbers follow the Chinese style of grouping by 10,000. Two pronunciations are used: the Sino-Japanese (on'yomi) readings of the Chinese characters and the Japanese yamato kotoba (native words, kun'yomi readings).

== Numbering in Japanese ==
There are two ways of writing the numbers in Japanese: in Arabic numerals (1, 2, 3) or in Chinese numerals (一, 二, 三). The Arabic numerals are more often used in horizontal writing, and the Chinese numerals are more common in vertical writing.

Most numbers have two readings, one derived from Chinese used for cardinal numbers (On reading) and a native Japanese reading (Kun reading) used somewhat less formally for numbers up to 10. In some cases (listed below) the Japanese reading is generally preferred for all uses. Archaic readings are marked with †.

Number	Character	On reading	Kun reading	Preferred reading
0	零 / 〇^{*}	rei (れい)	maru (まる)	zero (ゼロ) (loanword from English, gairaigo)
1	一	ichi (いち)	hito(tsu) (ひと・つ)	ichi (いち)
2	二	ni (に)	futa(tsu) (ふた・つ)	ni (に)
3	三	san (さん)	mit(tsu) (みっ・つ)	san (さん)
4	四	shi (し)	yon, yot(tsu) (よん、よっ・つ)	yon (よん)
5	五	go (ご)	itsu(tsu) (いつ・つ)	go (ご)
6	六	roku (ろく)	mut(tsu) (むっ・つ)	roku (ろく)
7	七	shichi (しち)	nana(tsu) (なな・つ)	nana (なな)
8	八	hachi (はち)	yat(tsu) (やっ・つ)	hachi (はち)
9	九	ku, kyū (く, きゅう)	kokono(tsu) (ここの・つ)	kyū (きゅう)
10	十	jū (じゅう)	tō (とお)	jū (じゅう)
20	二十	ni-jū (にじゅう)	hata (はた)†	ni-jū (にじゅう)
30	三十	san-jū (さんじゅう)	miso (みそ)†	san-jū (さんじゅう)
40	四十	shi-jū (しじゅう)	yoso (よそ)†	yon-jū (よんじゅう)
50	五十	go-jū (ごじゅう)	iso (いそ)†	go-jū (ごじゅう)
60	六十	roku-jū (ろくじゅう)	muso (むそ)†	roku-jū (ろくじゅう)
70	七十	shichi-jū (しちじゅう)	nanaso (ななそ)†	nana-jū (ななじゅう)
80	八十	hachi-jū (はちじゅう)	yaso (やそ)†	hachi-jū (はちじゅう)
90	九十	ku-jū (くじゅう)	kokonoso (ここのそ)†	kyū-jū (きゅうじゅう)
100	百	hyaku, ippyaku (ひゃく, いっぴゃく)	momo (もも)†	hyaku (ひゃく)
500	五百	go-hyaku (ごひゃく)	io (いお)†	go-hyaku (ごひゃく)
800	八百	hap-pyaku (はっぴゃく)	yao (やお)†	hap-pyaku (はっぴゃく)
1,000	千	sen (せん)	chi (ち)†	sen (せん)
10,000	万	man (まん)	yorozu (よろず)†	man (まん)
100,000,000	億	oku (おく)	—	oku (おく)
10^{12}	兆	chō (ちょう)	—	chō (ちょう)
10^{16}	京	kei (けい)	—	kei (けい)
10^{20}	垓	gai (がい)	—	gai (がい)
10^{24}	𥝱	jo (じょ)	—	jo (じょ)
10^{28}	穣	jō (じょう)	—	jō (じょう)
10^{32}	溝	kō (こう)	—	kō (こう)
10^{36}	澗	kan (かん)	—	kan (かん)
10^{40}	正	sei (せい)	—	sei (せい)
10^{44}	載	sai (さい)	—	sai (さい)
10^{48}	極	goku (ごく)	—	goku (ごく)

* The special reading 〇 (maru; which means "round" or "circle") is also found. It may be optionally used when reading individual digits of a number one after another, instead of as a full number. A popular example is the famous 109 store in Shibuya, Tokyo which is read as ichi-maru-kyū (Kanji: 一〇九). (It can also be read as 'ten-nine'—pronounced tō-kyū—which is a pun on the name of the Tokyo department store which owns the building.) This usage of maru for numerical 0 is similar to reading numeral 0 in English as oh. However, as a number, it is only written as 0 or rei (零). Additionally, two and five are pronounced with a long vowel in phone numbers (i.e. にい nī and ごお gō). Numbers after kei are rarely used. They are presented here nonetheless.

As noted above, yon (4) and nana (7) are preferred to shi and shichi. It is purported that this is because shi is also the reading of the word death (死), which makes it an unlucky reading (see tetraphobia); while shichi may sound too similar to ichi (1), shi or hachi (8). However, in quite a number of established words and phrases, shi and shichi are preferred; additionally, when counting (as in "ichi, ni, san, shi,..."), shi and shichi may be preferred.

The number 9 is also considered unlucky; when pronounced ku, it is a homophone for suffering (苦). The number 13 is sometimes considered unlucky, though this is a carryover from Western tradition. In contrast, 7 and sometimes 8 are considered lucky in Japanese.

In modern Japanese, cardinal numbers except 4 and 7 are generally given the on readings. Alternate readings are used in month names, day-of-month names, and fixed phrases; for instance, April, July, and September are called shi-gatsu (4th month), shichi-gatsu (7th month), and ku-gatsu (9th month) respectively (for further detail see Japanese counter word#Exceptions). The on readings are also used when shouting out headcounts (e.g. ichi-ni-san-shi).

Larger numbers are made by combining these elements:

- Tens from 20 to 90 are "(digit)-jū" as in 二十 (ni-jū) to 九十 (kyū-jū).
- Hundreds from 200 to 900 are "(digit)-hyaku".
- Thousands from 2000 to 9000 are "(digit)-sen".

Starting at a myriad (万), numbers begin with 一 (ichi) if no digit would otherwise precede. That is, 100 is just 百 (hyaku), and 1000 is just 千 (sen), but 10000 is 一万 (ichiman), not just *man. (This differs from Chinese, where numbers begin with 一 if no digit would otherwise precede starting at 100.) And, if 千 (sen) directly precedes the name of powers of myriad, 一 (ichi) is normally attached before 千 (sen), which yields 一千 (issen). That is, 10,000,000 (parsed as 1000,0000) is normally read as 一千万 (issenman). But if 千 (sen) does not directly precede the name of powers of myriad, attaching 一 (ichi) is optional. That is, 15,000,000 (1500,0000) is read as 千五百万 (sengohyakuman) or 一千五百万 (issengohyakuman), just as 1500 is read as 千五百 (sengohyaku) or 一千五百 (issengohyaku).

There are some phonetic modifications to larger numbers involving voicing or gemination of certain consonants, as typically occurs in Japanese (i.e. rendaku): e.g. roku "six" and hyaku "hundred" yield roppyaku "six hundred".

×	1	2	3	4	5	6	7	8	9	10	100	1000
100	hyaku, ippyaku	nihyaku	sanbyaku	yonhyaku	gohyaku	roppyaku	nanahyaku	happyaku	kyūhyaku	—	—	—
1,000	sen, issen	nisen	sanzen	yonsen	gosen	rokusen	nanasen	hassen	kyūsen	—	—	—
10^{12}	itchō	nichō	sanchō	yonchō	gochō	rokuchō	nanachō	hatchō	kyūchō	jutchō*	hyakuchō	issenchō
10^{16}	ikkei	nikei	sankei	yonkei	gokei	rokkei	nanakei	hakkei	kyūkei	jukkei*	hyakkei**	issenkei

* This also applies to multiples of 10. Change ending -jū to -jutchō or -jukkei.
** This also applies to multiples of 100. Change ending -ku to -kkei.

In numbers above 10, elements are combined from largest to smallest, and zeros are implied. Japanese numerals are multiplicative additive rather than positional; to write the number 20 you get the character for two (二) and then the character for ten (十) to get two tens or twenty (二十).

Number	Character	Reading	Basic meaning
11	十一	jū ichi	Ten and one
17	十七	jū nana, jū shichi	Ten and seven
151	百五十一	hyaku go-jū ichi	Hundred, five tens and one
302	三百二	san-byaku ni	Three hundreds and two
469	四百六十九	yon-hyaku roku-jū kyū	Four hundreds, six tens and nine
2025	二千二十五	ni-sen ni-jū go	Two thousands, two tens and five

=== Strings of digits and decimal numbers ===
The above digits from 1 to 9 are used primarily in isolation. Strings of digits make use of slightly different readings, with lengthened vowels, for 2 (nī) and 5 (gō), and less frequently, 4 (shī) and 9 (kū). This is because when digits are enumerated, if possible, they must be so in groups of two, each of which must consist of exactly four morae, which necessitates the lengthening of normally unimoraic digits such as ni, go, shi and ku. For example, such string as 54262 is pronounced gō-yon nī-roku ni, with the first two groups being quadrimoraic. The accent is placed on the penultimate mora of each group if possible, hence [ɡò̞ó̞ jó̞ɲ̟̀ | ɲ̟ìí ɾó̞kɯ̈̀ | ɲ̟í].

This rule also applies to the last digit of the integer part and all the digits of the decimal part of a decimal number. For example, such decimal number as 252.255 is pronounced nihyaku gojū nī-ten nī-gō go [ɲ̟ì çjä́.kɯ̈́ | ɡò̞ (ɟ̟͡)ʑɨ́ɨ̀ | ɲ̟íì tè̞ɲ̟̀ | ɲ̟ìí ɡó̞ò̞ | ɡó̞], with ten meaning "point".

=== Other types of numerals ===
For ordinal numbers, see Japanese counter word#Ordinal numbers.

Distributive numbers are formed regularly from a cardinal number, a counter word, and the suffix -zutsu (ずつ), as in hitori-zutsu (一人ずつ, one person at a time, one person each).

== Powers of 10 ==
=== Large numbers ===
Following Chinese tradition, large numbers are created by grouping digits into myriads (every 10,000) rather than the Western thousands (1,000):

Rank	10^{4}	10^{8}	10^{12}	10^{16}	10^{20}	10^{24}	10^{28}	10^{32}	10^{36}	10^{40}	10^{44}	10^{48}	10^{52} (or 10^{56})	10^{56} (or 10^{64})	10^{60} (or 10^{72})	10^{64} (or 10^{80})	10^{68} (or 10^{88})
Character	万	億	兆	京	垓	𥝱, 秭	穣	溝	澗	正	載	極	恒河沙	阿僧祇	那由他, 那由多	不可思議	無量大数
Reading	man	oku	chō	kei	gai	jo, shi	jō	kō	kan	sei	sai	goku	gōgasha	asōgi	nayuta	fukashigi	muryōtaisū

Variation is due to the Jinkōki (塵劫記), Japan's oldest mathematics text. The initial edition was published in 1627 and had many errors, most of which were fixed in the 1631 edition. In 1634, there was yet another edition which again changed a few values. The above variation is due to inconsistencies in the latter two editions. There are different characters for 10^{24} (of which 秭 is in Chinese today), and after 10^{48} they differ in whether they continue increasing by a factor of 10^{4} or switch to 10^{8}. (If by a factor of 10^{8}, the intervening factors of 10^{4} are produced with 万 (man). The current edition of the Jinkōki, the 11th, follows a factor of 10^{4} throughout, though some people still use the values from the 8th edition even today.)

The first three numbers with multisyllabic names and variation in assigned values ultimately derive from India, though they did not have defined values there. 恒河沙 (gōgasha) was originally used in Buddhist scripture for an indefinitely large quantity; it derives from the Sanskrit गङ्गा gangā 'Ganges' (which conveniently includes the character 河 (ka, 'river')) and 沙 (sha, 'sand'), referring to the innumerable sands of the Ganges River. 阿僧祇 (asōgi), from Sanskrit असंख्येय asaṃkhyeya 'uncountable/innumerable', with the negative prefix 阿 (a), and 那由他 (nayuta) is from Sanskrit नयुत/नयुतः nayuta(ḥ). After that, the numbers are Buddhist terms translated into or coined in Chinese and later assigned numerical values: 不可思議 (fukashigi, 'unimaginable') and 無量大数 (muryōtaisū, 'immeasurably large number').

Examples: (spacing by groups of four digits is given only for clarity of explanation)

- 1 0000 : 一万 (ichi-man)
- 983 6703 : 九百八十三万 六千七百三 (kyū-hyaku hachi-jū san-man, roku-sen nana-hyaku san)
- 20 3652 1801 : 二十億 三千六百五十二万 千八百一 (ni-jū oku, san-zen rop-pyaku go-jū ni-man, sen hap-pyaku ichi)

However, numbers written in Arabic numerals are separated by commas every three digits following English-speaking convention. If Arabic numbers and kanji are used in combination, Western orders of magnitude may be used for numbers smaller than 10,000 (e.g. 2,500万 for 25,000,000).

In Japanese, when long numbers are written out in kanji, zeros are omitted for all powers of ten. Hence 4002 is 四千二 (in contrast, Chinese requires the use of 零 wherever a zero appears, e.g. 四千零二 for 4002). However, when reading out a statement of accounts, for example, the skipped digit or digits are sometimes indicated by tobi (飛び) or tonde (飛んで)): e.g. yon-sen tobi ni or yon-sen tonde ni instead of the normal yon-sen ni.

=== Decimal fractions ===
Japanese has two systems of numerals for decimal fractions. They are no longer in general use, but are still used in some instances such as batting and fielding averages of baseball players, winning percentages for sports teams, and in some idiomatic phrases such as 五分五分の勝負 (gobugobu no shōbu; 'fifty-fifty chance'), and when representing a rate or discount. The bu fractions are also used when talking about fevers—for example 九度二分 (kudonibu) for 9 and two parts—referring to the temperature 39.2°C.

One system is as follows:

Rank	10^{−1}	10^{−2}	10^{−3}	10^{−4}	10^{−5}	10^{−6}	10^{−7}	10^{−8}	10^{−9}	10^{−10}
Character	分	厘	毛	糸	忽	微	繊	沙	塵	埃
Reading	bu	rin	mō	shi	kotsu	bi	sen	sha	jin	ai

This is the system used with the traditional Japanese units of measurement. Several of the names are used "as is" to represent a fraction of a sun.

The other system of representing these decimal fractions of rate or discount uses a system "shifted down" with a bu becoming a "one hundredth" and so on, and the unit for "tenth" becoming wari:

Rank	10^{−1}	10^{−2}	10^{−3}	10^{−4}	10^{−5}
Character	割	分	厘	毛	糸
Reading	wari	bu	rin	mō	shi

This is often used with prices. For example:

- 一割五分引き (ichi-wari go-bu biki): 15% discount
- 打率三割八分九厘 (daritsu san-wari hachi-bu kyū-rin): batting average .389

With the exception of wari, these are rarely seen in modern usage. Decimal fractions are typically written with either kanji numerals (vertically) or Arabic numerals (horizontally), preceded by a decimal point, and are read as successive digits, as in Western convention. Note that, in written form, they can be combined with either the traditional system of expressing numerals (42.195 kilometers: 四十二・一九五 キロメートル), in which powers of ten are written, or with the place value system, which uses zero (50.04 percent: 五〇・〇四 パーセント.) In both cases, however, the reading follows the traditional system (yon-jū ni-ten ichi-kyū go kiromētoru for 42.195 kilometers; go ju-tten rei-yon pāsento for 50.04 percent.)

== Formal numbers ==
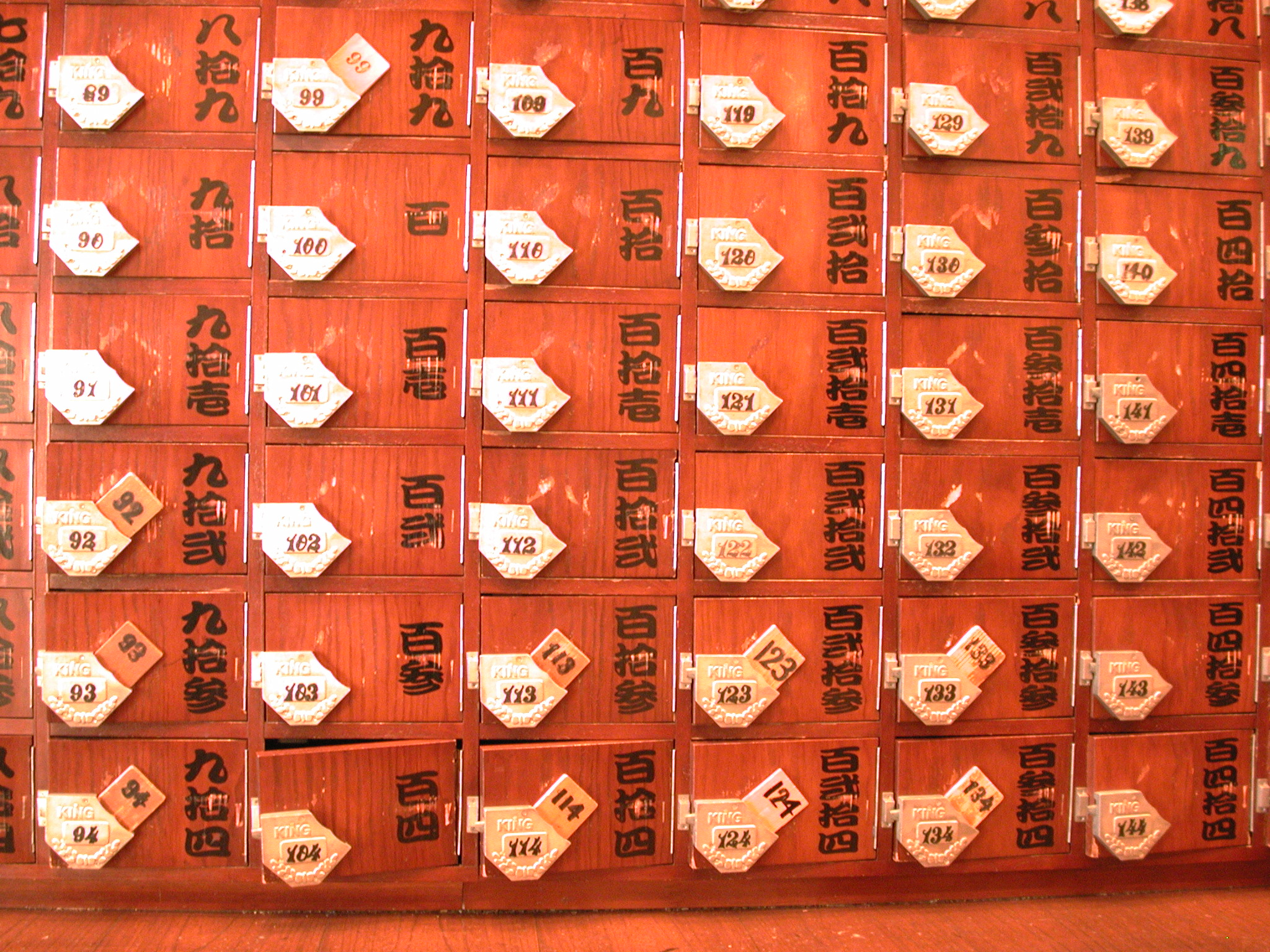
Getabako

As with Chinese numerals, there exists in Japanese a separate set of kanji for numerals called daiji (大字) used in legal and financial documents to prevent unscrupulous individuals from adding a stroke or two, turning a one into a two or a three. The formal numbers are identical to the Chinese formal numbers except for minor stroke variations. Today, the numbers for one, two, three, and ten are written only in their formal form in legal documents (the numbers 4 to 9 as well as 100, 1000 and 10000 are written identically to the common ones, cf. table below). These numbers' common forms can be changed to a higher value by adding strokes (1 and 2 were explained above, while 3 can be changed to 5, and 10 to 1000). In some cases, the digit 1 is explicitly written like 壱百壱拾 for 110, as opposed to 百十 in common writing.

Formal numbers:

Number	Common	Formal	
Number	Common	In use	Obsolete
1	一	壱	壹
2	二	弐	貳
3	三	参	參
4	四	四	肆
5	五	五	伍
6	六	六	陸
7	七	七	柒, 漆
8	八	八	捌
9	九	九	玖
10	十	拾	拾
100	百	百	佰
1000	千	千	阡, 仟
10000	万	万, 萬	萬

The four current banknotes of the Japanese yen, 1000-yen, 2000-yen, 5000-yen, and 10000-yen, have formal numbers 千, 弐千, 五千, and 壱万, respectively.

== Old Japanese ==
Old Japanese shares some vocabulary with later periods, but there are also unique number terms over 10 which are not used any more, aside from being parts of specific lexemes.

Notes:

- The transcription is based on the phoneme and is not phonetic. See Old Japanese for further information.
- See Jōdai Tokushu Kanazukai for information on subscript notation.

Number	Reading	Examples	Notes
1	pi_{1}to_{2}	一日 pi_{1}to_{2}pi_{1} (1 day), 一年 pi_{1}to_{2}to_{2}se (1 year)	
2	futa	二夜 futayo_{2} (2 nights)	
3	mi_{1}	三十 mi_{1}so_{1} (30)	
4	yo_{2}	四十 yo_{2}so_{1} (40), 四人 yo_{2}tari (4 people)	
5	itu	五年 ituto_{2}se (5 years)	
6	mu	六爪 mutuma (6 claws)	
7	nana	七瀬 nanase (many rapids)	Often used to mean many.
8	ya	八雲 yakumo_{1} (many clouds)	Often used to mean many.
9	ko_{2}ko_{2}no_{2}	九柱 ko_{2}ko_{2}no_{2}pasira (9 nobles / gods)	
10	to_{2} / to_{2}wo	十日 to_{2}woka (10 days)	
10	so_{1}	三十 mi_{1}so_{1} (30), 四十 yo_{2}so_{1} (40), 六十 muso_{1} (60), 八十 yaso_{1} (80)	Found only in compound words; not used alone.
20	pata	二十 patati (20), 二十人 patatari (20 people), 二十年 patato_{2}se (20 years)	
50	i	五十日 ika (50 days)	
100	po	五百 ipo (500), 五百年 ipoto_{2}se (500 years), 五百夜 ipoyo_{2} (500 nights), 八百 yapo (800), 三百 mi_{1}po (300), 六百 mupo (600), 九百 ko_{2}ko_{2}no_{2}po (900)	Used for multiple hundreds in compound numerals. Often used to mean many.
100	mo_{1}mo_{1}	百日 mo_{1}mo_{1}ka (many days)	Used for non-multiple hundred and for the number "100" by itself. Often used to mean many.
1000	ti	千年 tito_{2}se (1000 years, many years)	Often used to mean many.
10000	yo_{2}ro_{2}du	八百万 yapoyo_{2}ro_{2}du (8000000, myriad)	Often used to mean many.

== Hand counting ==
Japanese uses separate systems for counting for oneself and for displaying numbers to others, which both proceed up to ten. For counting, one begins with the palm open, then counts up to five by curling up (folding down) the fingers, starting from the thumb – thus one has just the thumb down (and others extended), while four has only the little finger extended, and five has a fist. One then counts up to ten by proceeding in the reverse order, extending the fingers, starting at the little finger – thus six is the same as four, seven the same as three, and so forth, with ten ending with the palm open. While this introduces ambiguity, it is not used to present to others, so this is generally not a problem. When displaying for others, one starts with the hand closed, and extends fingers, starting with the index, going to the little finger, then ending with the thumb, as in the United States. For numbers above five, one uses an open hand (indicating five) and places the appropriate number of fingers from the other hand against the palm (palms facing each other) – so six has the index finger against the palm, and so forth. To display ten, one presents both hands open and palm outwards.

== Digits in written words ==
Since the adoption of Arabic numerals, it has become more and more common for numbers to be written using them. Counters and ordinal numbers are typically written in Arabic numbers, such as 3人 (san-nin, three people), 7月 (shichigatsu, July, "seventh-month"), 20歳 (hatachi, age 20), etc., although 三人, 七月 and 二十歳 are also acceptable to write (albeit less common). However, numbers that are part of lexemes are typically written in kanji. For example, the term yaoya (八百屋, 'vegetable stand / grocer') translates into "800 store" and uses the Old Japanese pronunciation for 800, ya(h)o. The notorious Japanese organized crime syndicate, the yakuza, can be written 八九三 (or 893), a hand in oicho-kabu that is worth 0 points, indicating that yakuza are "worthless persons" or "gambling persons".

== See also ==
- Chinese numerals
- Decimal separator
- Japanese counter word
- Japanese people
- Japanese wordplay § Numeric substitution
