= List of Chinese classifiers =

In the tables, the first two columns contain the Chinese characters representing the classifier, in Traditional and Simplified characters when they differ. The next four columns give its pronunciations in Standard Mandarin, using Pinyin; Standard Cantonese, using Jyutping and Yale, respectively; and General Taiwanese, using Tai-lo. The last column gives the classifier's literal meaning within quotation marks and its principal uses.

== Nominal classifiers ==
=== Classifiers proper ===
Trad.	Simp.	Mandarin (Pinyin)	Cantonese (Jyutping)	Cantonese (Yale)	Taiwanese (Tai-lo)	Meaning and principal uses
把		bǎ	baa2	ba2	pé	"grip" — objects with handle-like parts (knives 刀, scissors 剪刀, swords 劍/剑, keys 鑰匙/钥匙, pistols 手槍/手枪, chairs 椅子, flaming torches or sticks 火)
本		běn	bun2	bun2	pún	"volume" — bound print matter (books 書/书, etc.)
埲			bung6	bung6		walls 墻 (Cantonese only)
部		bù	bou6	bou6	phō	"part" — novels 小說/小说, movies 電影/电影, TV dramas etc.; vehicles (如：一部大巴）; Cantonese only: machines
冊/册	册/冊	cè	caak3	chaak3	tsheh	volumes of books (冊 is more common in Traditional Chinese, 册 in Simplified)
層	层	céng	cang4	chang4	tsàn	"layer" — cakes, optical discs, etc.; stories of buildings
場	场	chǎng	coeng4	cheung4	tiûnn	"stage" — public spectacles, games 比賽/比赛, drama 戲/戏, film 電影/电影, etc.
處	处	chù	cyu3	chyu3	tshú	"location", "site" — ruins 廢墟/废墟, construction site 工地, etc.
齣	出	chū	ceot1	cheut1	tshut	"performance", "show" — plays 戲/戏, circus 馬戲/马戏, etc.
次		cì	ci3	chi3	tshù	"time" — opportunities 機會/机会, accidents 事故
道		dào	dou6	dou6	tō	linear projections (light rays 亮光, etc.), orders given by an authority figure 命令, courses (of food) 點心/点心, walls and doors 門/门, questions 題/题, number of times (for certain procedures) 工序
頂	顶	dǐng	deng2	deng2	tíng	objects with protruding top (hats 帽子, etc.)
棟	栋	dòng	dung6	dung6	tòng	"pillar" — buildings 房子
堵		dǔ	dou6	dou6	tóo	walls and encompassing fixtures 牆/墙
頓	顿	dùn	deon6	deun6	tǹg	meals 飯/饭
朵		duǒ	do2/doe2	do2/deu2	luí	flowers 花, clouds 雲/云
發	发	fā	faat3	faat3	huat	projectile weapons, such as bullets 子彈/子弹, artillery shells 炮彈/炮弹, rockets, guided missiles etc.
份		fèn	fan6	fan6	hūn	"copy" — newspapers 報紙/报纸, notarized document 公證/公证, contract 合同
封		fēng	fung1	fung1	hong	letters 信, mail, fax 傳真/传真
幅		fú	fuk1	fuk1	pak	"width" — paintings 畫兒/画儿; curtains; tapestries; photographs or prints (particularly when mounted and displayed on a wall)
桿	杆	gǎn	gon3	gon3	kuáinn	objects with "pole" (spears 槍/枪, balance scales, steelyard balance)
個	个	ge (gè)	go3	go3	ê	individual things, people — generic measure word (usage of this classifier in conjunction with any noun is generally accepted if the person does not know the proper classifier)
根		gēn	gan1	gan1	kun	thin, slender, pole, stick objects (needles 針/针, pillars 支柱, telegraph poles, matchsticks, etc.); strands 絲/丝(e.g. hair 頭髮/头发)
號	号	hào	hou6	hou6		people, workmen (一百多号人/一百多號人); business deals (几号买卖/幾號買賣)
家		jiā	gaa1	ga1		gathering of people (families 人家, companies 公司, etc.), establishments (shops 商店, restaurants 酒店, hotels 飯店/饭店)
架		jià	gaa3	ga3		aircraft 飛機/飞机, pianos 琴, machines 儀器/仪器
間	间	jiān	gaan1	gaan1	king	rooms 屋子, 房; Cantonese only: stores, companies
件		jiàn	gin6	gin6	kiānn	matters (affairs 事情), clothing 衣裳, etc.
屆	届	jiè	gaai3	gaai3	kài	recurring, often annual, conferences 會/会, class years in a school (e.g. Class of 2006) 畢業生/毕业生
卷		juǎn	gyun2	gyun2	kńg	"roll" — film 膠卷/胶卷, toilet paper 手紙/手纸
棵		kē	fo2	fo2		trees (樹/树) and other such flora
顆	颗	kē	fo2	fo2		"kernel" — small objects (beans, hearts 心, pearls 珠子, teeth 牙齒/牙齿, diamonds 鑽石/钻石, etc.) pillows, and objects appearing to be small (distant stars 星星 and planets 星球)
口		kǒu	hau2	hau2		people in villages 人, family members; wells 井; blade 刀
類	类	lèi	leoi6	leui6	luī	objects of the same type or category — affair 事情, circumstance 情況/情况
粒		lì	lap1	lap1	lia̍p	"grain", small objects such as a grain of rice 米
輛	辆	liàng	loeng2	leung2		wheeled vehicles: automobiles 汽車/汽车, bicycles 自行車/自行车, etc.
列		liè	lit6/laat3	lit6		"array" — trains 火車/火车
輪	轮	lún	leon4	leun4		"round" — competition 比賽/比赛, discussions 會談/会谈; moon 明月
枚		méi	mui4	mui4		small, flat objects (coins, medals, stamps); small, round jewelry (rings 戒指, diamonds 鑽石/钻石); projectiles (bombs 炸彈/炸弹, grenades 手榴彈/手榴弹, rockets, satellites); eggs 蛋
門	门	mén	mun4	mun4		"gate" — areas of knowledge (courses 課/课, languages 語言/语言, majors 專業/专业, etc.), also for artillery pieces 大砲/大炮.
面		miàn	min6	min6		"surface" — flat objects (mirrors 鏡子/镜子, flags 旗子, etc.)
名		míng	ming4	ming4		honorific, or persons with perceived higher social rank (doctors 醫生/医生, lawyers 律師/律师, politicians, royalty, etc.); in formal occasions or in literary Chinese, also used for any type of person (not necessarily high-ranking, e.g. mother 母親)
盤	盘	pán	pun4	pun4	puânn	flat objects (video cassettes 錄影帶/录影带, etc.); literally means "dishes" and can be used for a plate of food
泡		pào, pāo	paau1	paau1		classifiers for liquid extractions (tea 茶, urine 尿)
匹		pǐ	pat1	pat1		horses 馬/马 and other mounts; also rolls/bolts of cloth 布
坺			pet6	pet6		(Cantonese only) small pile of thick, viscous substance — mud, feces, etc.
篇		piān	pin1	pin1	phinn	written work: papers 論文/论文, articles 文章, novels etc.
片		piàn	pin3	pin3	phìnn	"slice" — flat objects, cards, slices of bread 麵包/面包, etc.
樖			po1	po1		(Cantonese only) trees (樹/树) and other such flora
起		qǐ	hei2	hei2		case, instance (两起大脑炎); batch, group (分两起出发)
扇		shàn	sin3	sin3		doors 門/门, windows 窗戶/窗户.
首		shǒu	sau2	sau2		songs 歌, poems 詩/诗, music 曲子, etc.
水		shuǐ	seoi2	seui2		washings/rinsings (这件衬衫洗了三水了)
艘		sōu	sau2	sau2		ships 船
所		suǒ	so2	so2		for buildings whose purposes are explicitly stated, e.g. hospitals 醫院/医院. Otherwise can use "座"
臺/台	台	tái	toi4	toi4	tâi	heavy objects, esp. machines (TVs 電視機/电视机, computers 電腦/电脑, etc.); performances (theatre 話劇/话剧, etc.)
堂		táng	tong4	tong4		periods of classes 課/课 (e.g. "I have two classes today"), suites of furniture
趟		tàng	tong3	tong3		trips (usually repetitive), scheduled transportation services — flights 班機/班机
題	题	tí	tai4	tai4	tî	test/exam questions
挺		tǐng	ting5, ting2	ting5	thán	machine guns 機槍
條	条	tiáo	tiu4	tiu4	tiâu	"strip"; long, narrow, flexible objects — (fish 魚/鱼, dogs 狗, trousers 褲子/裤子, etc.), also for roads 路 and rivers 河, pertaining to human lives, e.g. "兩條人命" two (human) lives, "一條心", lit. "one heart" (to work as one), classifiers for certain things like counter-measures, etc.
頭	头	tóu	tau4	tau4		"head" — domesticated animals 家畜 (pigs 豬/猪, cows 牛, etc.), hair (only used alongside a modifier)
尾		wěi	mei5	mei5	bué	"tail" — fish 魚/鱼 (ancient)
位		wèi	wai2	wai2	uī	polite classifier for people (attached to positions, not names) — workers 工人, director 主任
項	项	xiàng	hong6	hong6	hāng	"item" — items, projects — initiative 倡議/倡议, ordinances 法令, statements 聲明/声明
宿		xiǔ	suk1	suk1		nights, overnight stays (住一宿)
樣	样	yàng	joeng6	yeung6		general items of differing attributes
𠹻			zam6	jam6		(Cantonese only) odor 味
則	则	zé	zak1	jak1		sections of text — notice 消息, jokes 笑話/笑话, news 新聞/新闻, etc.
盞	盏	zhǎn	zaan2	jaan2		light fixtures (usually lamps 燈/灯), pot of tea etc.
張	张	zhāng	zoeng1	jeung1	tiunn	"sheet" — flat objects (paper 紙/纸, tables 桌子, etc.), faces 臉/脸, bows, paintings 圖畫/图画, tickets 票, constellations, blankets, bedsheets 床單/床单; Cantonese only: chairs 凳
隻	只	zhī	zek3	jek3		one of a pair (hands 手, legs); animals (birds 鳥/鸟, cats 貓/猫, etc.)
支		zhī	zi1	ji1		fairly long, stick-like objects (pens 筆/笔, chopsticks, roses, rifles 槍/枪, etc.), fleets 舰队/艦隊
枝		zhī	zi1	ji1	ki	alternative form of 支 ("stalk"): can be used for rifles 槍/枪 and flowers
種	种	zhǒng	zung2	jung2	tsióng	types or kinds of objects (animals 動物/动物)
株		zhū	zyu1	jyu1		trees 樹/树
柱		zhù	cyu5	chyu5		incense 香
尊		zūn	zyun1	jyun1		statues 像
座		zuò	zo6	jo6	tsō	large mansion 大厦; mountains 山;

=== Measure words/massifiers ===
Trad.	Simp.	Mandarin (Pinyin)	Cantonese (Jyutping)	Cantonese (Yale)	Meaning and principal uses
把		bǎ	baa2	ba2	"handful" (beans, flour, rice, sand); "bunch"/"bundle" (chopsticks, matches, sticks); "bunch"/"hand" (bananas, carrots, flowers, scallions)
班		bān	baan1	baan1	classifier for scheduled transport services (trains 火車/火车, bus 公交, subway 地鐵/地铁, etc.); group of people; class as in pupils 學生/学生
幫	帮	bāng	bong1	bong1	group of people (children 孩子, friends 朋友, etc.); "gang", band of (bandits 匪徒, bad men 壞蛋/坏蛋, etc.)
包		bāo	baau1	baau1	"packet" (cookies 餅乾/饼干, cigarettes 香煙/香烟, French fries 薯條/薯条, screws, etc.)
杯		bēi	bui1	bui1	"cup" — container (cup, glass, mug, beaker, etc.) of liquid
輩	辈	bèi	bui3	bui3	"generation", "lifetime" (people 人)
筆	笔	bǐ	bat1	bat1	large quantities of money (money 錢/钱, funds 資金/资金, account items 賬目/账目)
串		chuàn	cyun3	chyun3	"string" — sequence of numbers 號碼/号码; pearls 珍珠; grapes 葡萄, skewer/stick (kebabs, satays, etc.)
床		chuáng	cong4	chong4	"bed" — blankets 毯子, sheets, quilt
沓		dá	daap6	daap6	a "stack" of (e.g. paper, or any other paper-like things)
袋		dài	doi6	doi6	"bag" — sackfuls, pouchfuls, bagfuls, pocketfuls (flour 麵粉/面粉, French fries 薯條/薯条, cements 水泥, etc.)
啖		dàn	daam6	daam6	(Cantonese only) "mouthful" — amount of food
啲/尐			di1	di1	(Cantonese only) "some", "a bit" — general massifier. Only used in the form 一啲, or without a number (e.g. after demonstratives).
滴		dī	dik6	dik6	"droplet" (water 水, blood 鮮血/鲜血, other such fluids)
點	点	diǎn	dim2	dim2	ideas 意見/意见, suggestions; can also mean "a bit" (often used to denote amount) — e.g. courage 膽量/胆量
段		duàn	dyun6	dyun6	"length" — cables 電線/电线, roadways 路, part as in a drama 臺詞/台词, etc.
堆		duī	deoi3	deui3	"pile" — trash 垃圾, sand 沙子, etc.
對	对	duì	deoi3	deui3	"pair" — "couple" 夫妻, "partner" 搭檔/搭档, ring 戒指, earrings 耳環/耳环, bracelet 手鐲/手镯; Cantonese only: pair of objects which naturally come in pairs (e.g. chopsticks 筷子, shoes 鞋, etc.)
服		fú	fuk6	fuk6	"dose" (medicine 藥/药)
副		fù	fu3	fu3	"set" — objects which come in pairs (gloves 手套, insole, couplets, etc.) also for spectacles/glasses 眼鏡/眼镜, mahjong 麻將/麻将, Chinese chess 象棋; pack of cards 牌
股		gǔ	gu2	gu2	flows (of air 氣/气, smell 香味, influence 潮流, etc.)
嚿	𫩥 (nonstandard) 嚿 (official)		gau6	gau6	(Cantonese only) "piece of", "chunk of" — rock, soap, ginger, charcoal, rice, etc.
管		guǎn	gun2	gun2	"tube" — toothpaste and things that comes in tubes
罐		guàn	gun3	gun3	for canned beverages (e.g. soda), milk powder, sardine, etc.; also for air tank, nitrogen tank, etc.
行		háng	hong4	hong4	"row" — objects which form lines (words 詞/词, etc.); occupations in a field (idiom, spoken language); 行 could also be pronounced as xíng, see below.
盒		hé	hap6	hap6	objects in a small "box" or case (e.g. mooncakes, tapes)
戶/户	户	hù	wu6	wu6	households (户 is common in handwritten Traditional Chinese) — household 人家
壺	壶	hú	wu4	wu4	liquids (usually drink) in a "pot" (tea, or sometimes rice wine) or kettle (usually water)
伙		huǒ	fo2	fo2	bands of people such as gangs or hoodlums (when heard it as classifier from news it is mostly derogatory); group of people (non-derogatory in some dialect)
劑	剂	jì	zai1	jai1	"dose" (medicine 藥/药)
節	节	jié	zit3	jit3	"section" of bamboo 竹子, sugarcane, etc.; branch of tree; a class period at school 課/课; columnar batteries, carriages of train (look like a section of bamboo)
句		jù	geoi3	geui3	"sentences" 句子, quotes 引用, lines 臺詞/台词, etc.
口		kǒu	hau2	hau2	"mouthful" — amount of food
塊	块	kuài	faai3	faai3	"chunk", "lump", "piece" — land 地, stones 石頭/石头, cake 蛋糕 (piece/slice), bread (not slices) 麵包/面包, candy 糖, tofu 豆腐, etc.; yuan (widely used in spoken language)
捆		kǔn	kwan2	kwan2	sets of bundled objects, usually pole-, rope- or stick-like stuffs (e.g. matchsticks 火柴, straw, wire, etc.)
倆	俩	liǎ	loeng5	leung5	sometimes used informally instead of 两个 (liǎng ge), to mean "two" (especially two things or people that are close to one another)
摞		luò (luǒ)	lo3, lo6	lo3, lo6	set of objects either be "stacked" (a stack of, e.g. books 書/书) or be piled (a pile of, e.g. bricks 磚/砖)
縷	缕	lǚ	leoi5	leui5	"strand" — hair, smoke 煙/烟, wind 風/风
排		pái	paai4	paai4	"row" — seats 座位, lanterns 燈籠/灯笼, aspen, etc.
批		pī	pai1	pai1	"shipment" — used when a large number of people (e.g. pupils) coming (e.g. entrance) or leaving (e.g. graduate) during the same period; also used for large amount of commodity, mass-produced objects (products 產品/产品, laptops, etc.) or supplies.
瓶		píng	ping4	ping4	objects in "bottle", vial, or flask. usually not too large so that people could takes by hands (e.g. lemonade, water, troche, etc.)
期		qī	kei4	kei4	(issues of) periodicals 期刊, magazine 雜誌/杂志
群		qún	kwan4	kwan4	"group" (people, students 學生/学生, etc.), "herd" (e.g. birds 鳥/鸟, horse 馬/马, etc.)
仨		sā	saam1	saam1	sometimes used informally instead of 三个 to mean "three", "three of"
束		shù	cuk1	chuk1	"bundle" of flowers 花; light 光, laser.
雙	双	shuāng	soeng1	seung1	"pair" — chopsticks 筷子, shoes 鞋, etc.
套		tào	tou3	tou3	"set" — books 書/书, teaware 茶具, collectibles, clothes 衣裳, etc.
聽(听)	听	tīng	ting1	ting1	for canned beverages (e.g. soda, cola) "tin" ("听" is common and informal in handwriting Traditional Chinese) — A recent loanword that have involved in Mandarin from Cantonese
團	团	tuán	tyun4	tyun4	"ball" — (balls of yarn 毛線/毛线, cotton, etc.)
坨		tuó	to4	to4	"lump" — mud 泥, feces 糞便/粪便
碗		wǎn	wun2	wun2	for food in "bowl" (e.g. soup 湯/汤, rice 米飯/米饭, congee 粥, wonton 餛飩/馄饨)
些		xiē	se1	se1	"some" — general massifier. Only used in the form 一些, or without a number (e.g. after demonstratives).
行		xíng	hang4	hang4	groups of people traveling together, such as a trade commission or diplomats and aides visiting a foreign country: "国王一行人离开巴黎后十分兴奋" (having left Paris, the king and entourage were very excited). Note: almost only used in the form 一行人. — 行 is also read háng, see above.
匝		zā	zaap3	jaap3	number of revolutions
扎		zhā	zaat3	ja1	In Cantonese usage, this is used in lieu of shù (束), e.g. a bundle of flowers "jar", "jug" — beverages such as beer, soda, juice, etc. (A recent loan-word from English, it may be considered informal or slang.)
陣	阵	zhèn	zan6	jan6	"gust", "burst" — events with short durations (e.g. lightning storms, gusts of wind 風/风, etc.)
注		zhù	zyu3	jyu3	a "pour" of water, tea (liquid); a "bet" — lottery 彩票
組	组	zǔ	zou2	jou2	"set" — general mass-classifier for sets of objects (sets of, e.g. batteries 電池/电池, planets 行星, variables 變量/变量, data 数据/數據, objects 對象/对象, words 詞/词, or any sensible thing you want to name). A set is usually assumed to have two or more objects. But there are also exceptions: depends on what object the classifier is used for, the quantity of objects in sets may be assumed without context. When assumed, the classifier usually falls back to play a similar role to either 雙/双, 副 or 對/对: for example, when used for certain objects that come in pairs, e.g. 搭檔/搭档, represented as 一組搭檔/一组搭档 (一對搭档/一对搭档 is valid), here the quantity in each set is assumed to be two (i.e. one pair). Note that when used for other naturally paired things, like chopsticks 筷子, represented as *一組筷子/一组筷子; here the quantity of objects is unspecified if no context specific it, as people never use 組/组 for chopsticks as a natural in-pair object classifier (That is, except for certain objects like 搭檔/搭档, the classifier 組/组 won't fallback to 雙/双, 副 et al. when used for objects in pairs.)

=== Measurement units ===
Trad.	Simp.	Mandarin (Pinyin)	Cantonese (Jyutping)	Cantonese (Yale)	Meaning
Time
秒		miǎo	miu5	miu5	"second"
分		fēn	fan1	fan1	"minute"
刻		kè	hak1 haak1	hak1 haak1	"quarter","15 minutes" (mainly in certain dialects, such as Shanghainese, and translations)
天		tiān	tin1	tin1	"day"
日		rì	jat6	yat6	"day"
年		nián	nin4	nin4	"year"
載	载	zǎi	zoi2 zoi3	joi2 joi3	"year" (ancient)
歲	岁	suì	seoi3	seoi3	"year of age"
Weight/mass
克		kè	hak1 haak1	hak1 haak1	"gram"
兩	两	liǎng	loeng2	leung2	50 grams(1/10 jīn), used to be 1/16 jīn
加崙/加侖	加仑	jiālùn	gaa1 leon2	gaa1 leun2	gallon
斤		jīn	gan1	gan1	"catty", "pound", 1/2 kilograms
公斤		gōngjīn	gung1 gan1	gung1 gan1	"metric jīn", kilogram
千克		qiānkè	cin1 hak1/haak1	chin1 hak1/haak1	"kilogram"
噸	吨	dūn	deon1	deun1	"ton"
Length/distance
公分		gōngfēn	gung1 fan1	gung1 fan1	"metric fēn", centimetre
厘米		límǐ	lei4 mai5	lei4 mai5	"centimetre" (More common in mainland China and Hong Kong)
寸		cùn	cyun3	chyun3	Chinese "inch" (1/3 of a decimetre)
吋		cùn	cyun3	chyun3	British inch
尺		chǐ	ce2/cek3	che2/chek3	Chinese "foot" (1/3 of a metre)
呎		chǐ	cek3	chek3	British foot
英尺		yīngchǐ	jing1 cek3	ying1 chek3	British foot
公尺		gōngchǐ	gung1 cek3	gung1 chek3	"metric chǐ", metre
米		mǐ	mai5	mai5	"metre"
里		lǐ	lei5	lei5	"lǐ", (500 metres)
哩		lǐ	le1/lei5/li1	le1/lei5/li1	British mile/Statute mile (5280 British feet)
英里		yīnglǐ	jing1 lei5	ying1 lei5	British mile/Statute mile
海里		hǎilǐ	hai5 lei5	hai5 lei5	"nautical mile" (1852 meters, about 6076 British feet)
公里		gōnglǐ	gung1 lei5	gung1 lei5	"kilometre" (1000 metres)
天文單位	天文单位	tiānwéndānwèi	tin1 man4 daan1 wai2	tin1 man4 daan1 wai2	"astronomical unit"
光年		guāngnián	gwong1 nin4	gwong1 nin4	"light year"
秒差距		miǎochājù	miu5 caa1 geoi6	miu5 cha1 geui6	"parsec"
Money
圓/元	圆/元	yuán	jun4	yun4	"yuán", "¥" (main unit of currency) (either form can be used in Traditional Chinese text)
塊	块	kuài	faai3	faai3	"block", yuán (a slang term, like "quid" or "buck")
蚊		wén	man1	man1	"dollar", yuán (Cantonese slang)
角		jiǎo	gok3	gok3	"jiǎo", "dime", "tenpence"
毛		máo	mou4	mou4	"máo", "dime", "tenpence" (slang)
毫		háo	hou4	hou4	"dime", "tenpence" (Cantonese slang)
分		fēn	fan1/fan6	fan1/fan6	"fēn", "cent", "penny"

== Verbal classifiers ==
See Chinese classifier → Verbal classifiers.

Trad.	Simp.	Mandarin (Pinyin)	Cantonese (Jyutping)	Cantonese (Yale)	Meaning and uses
遍		biàn	bin3 pin3	bin3 pin3	the number of times an action has been completed, emphasizing the action's length and effort. e.g. 改了三遍，把课文读一遍
場	场	chǎng	coeng4	cheung4	a length of an event taking place within another event. e.g. 哭一场，演一场，（一場戲，一場表演）
次		cì	ci3	chi3	times (unlike 遍, 次 refers to the number of times regardless of whether or not it was completed). e.g. 每次，上一次，下一次，试了五次，（三次机会，第一次用，第两次出国）
頓	顿	dùn	deon6	deun6	actions without repetition. e.g. 打一顿，骂一顿，（一顿大，一顿骂）
回		huí	wui4	wui4	occurrences (used colloquially). e.g. 潇洒一回，来一回，走一回（過場）
聲	声	shēng	seng1/sing1	seng1/sing1	cries, shouts, etc. e.g. 砰的一声，哗一声，滴滴两声，（一声响，一声呼唤）
趟		tàng	tong3	tong3	trips, visitations, etc. e.g. 走一趟，去一趟，（一趟下来）
下		xià	haa5/haa6	ha5/ha6	brief and often sudden actions (much more common in Cantonese than in northern dialects). e.g. 咔嚓一下，噌的一下，跳兩下，按五下. also used as weakened injunctive mood. e.g. 來一下，幫我一下.

== See also ==
- Hokkien counter word
