= Transrealism =

Transrealism may refer to:

- Transrealism (literature)
- Poetic transrealism
