= Tetration =

Arithmetic operation

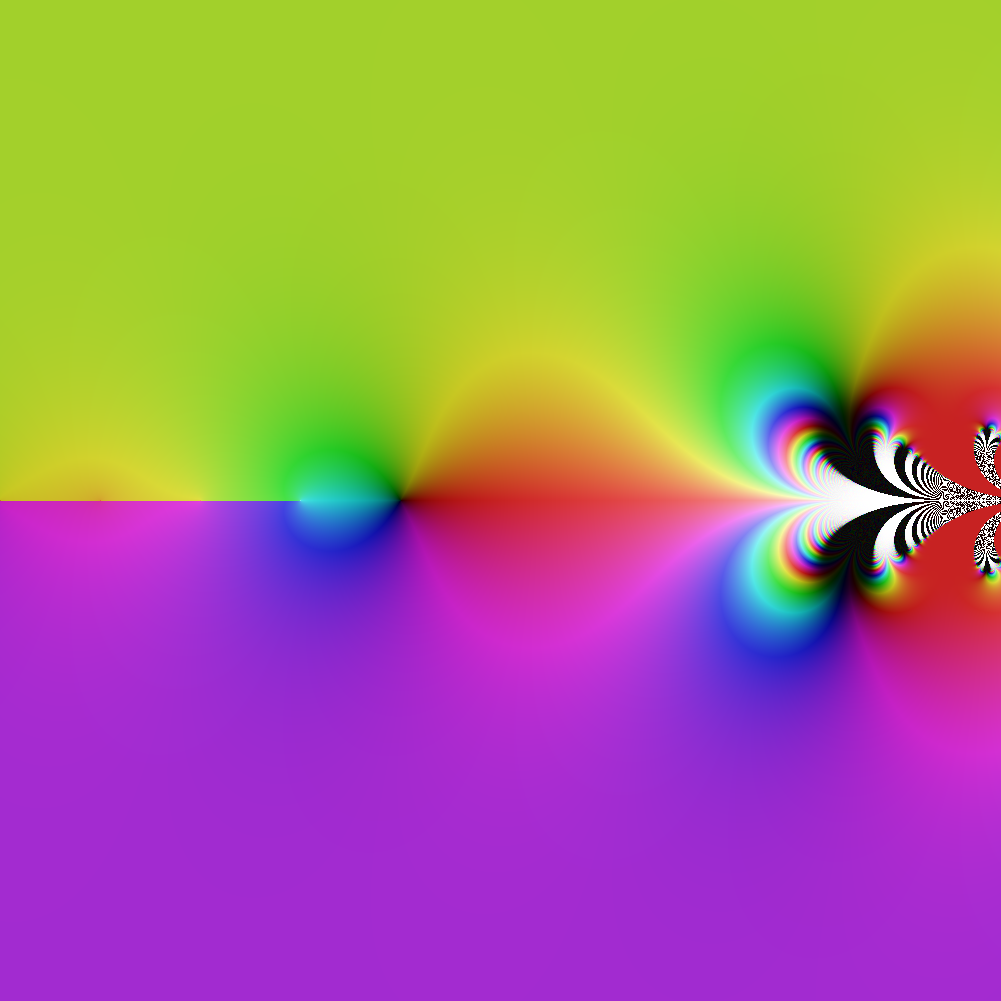
Domain coloring of the holomorphic tetration ${}^{z}e$, with hue representing the function argument and brightness representing magnitude

${}^{n}x$, for n = 2, 3, 4, ..., showing convergence to the infinitely iterated exponential between the two dots

In mathematics, tetration (or hyper-4) is an operation based on iterated, or repeated, exponentiation. There is no universal notation for tetration, though Knuth's up arrow notation $a\uparrow \uparrow n$ and the left-exponent ${}^{n}a$ are common.

Under the definition as repeated exponentiation, ${^{n}a}$ means $a^{a^{\cdot^{\cdot^{a}}}}$, where n copies of a are iterated via exponentiation right-to-left, i.e. the application of exponentiation $n-1$ times. The number n is called the height of the function, while a is called the base, analogous to exponentiation. It is read as "the n-th tetration of a". For example, 2 tetrated to 4 (or the fourth tetration of 2) is ${^{4}2}=2^{(2^{(2^{2})})}=2^{(2^{4})}=2^{16}=65536$.

Tetration is the hyperoperation after exponentiation and before pentation. Along with the other hyperoperations, tetration is used for the notation of very large numbers. The name was coined by Reuben Goodstein from the prefix tetra- (meaning "four") and the word "iteration".

Tetration can also be defined recursively as

$${a \uparrow \uparrow n} := \begin{cases} 1 &\text{if }n=0, \\ a^{a \uparrow\uparrow (n-1)} &\text{if }n>0. \end{cases}$$

This form allows for the extension of tetration to more general domains for n than the natural numbers such as real, complex, or ordinal numbers.

The two inverses of tetration are called super-root and super-logarithm. They are respectively analogous to the operations of taking n-th roots and taking logarithms. None of the three functions are elementary.

== Introduction ==
The first four hyperoperations are shown here, with tetration being considered the fourth in the series. The unary operation succession, defined as $a' = a + 1$, is considered to be the zeroth operation.

1. Addition
  $$a + n = a + \underbrace{1 + 1 + \cdots + 1}_n$$
  n copies of 1 added to a combined by succession.
2. Multiplication
  $$a \times n = \underbrace{a + a + \cdots + a}_n$$
  n copies of a combined by addition.
3. Exponentiation
  $$a^n = \underbrace{a \times a \times \cdots \times a}_n$$
  n copies of a combined by multiplication.
4. Tetration
  $${^{n}a} = \underbrace{a^{a^{\cdot^{\cdot^{a}}}}}_n$$
  n copies of a combined by exponentiation. Importantly, nested exponents are calculated from right to left: $c^{b^a}$ means $c^{\left(b^a \right)}$ and not $\left(c^b \right)^a.$

Succession, $a_{n+1} = a_n + 1$, is the most basic operation; while addition ($a + n$) is a primary operation, for addition of natural numbers it can be thought of as a chained succession of $n$ successors of $a$; multiplication ($a \times n$) is also a primary operation, though for natural numbers it can analogously be thought of as a chained addition involving $n$ numbers of $a$. Exponentiation can be thought of as a chained multiplication involving $n$ numbers of $a$ and tetration ($^{n}a$) as a chained power involving $n$ numbers $a$. Each of the operations above are defined by iterating the previous one; however, unlike the operations before it, tetration is not an elementary function.

The parameter $a$ is called the base, while the parameter $n$ may be referred to as the height. In the original definition of tetration, the height parameter must be a natural number; for instance, it would be illogical to say "three raised to itself negative five times" or "four raised to itself one half of a time". However, just as addition, multiplication, and exponentiation can be defined in ways that allow for extensions to real and complex numbers, several attempts have been made to generalize tetration to negative numbers, real numbers, and complex numbers. One such way for doing so is using a recursive definition for tetration; for any positive real $a > 0$ and non-negative integer $n \ge 0$, we can define ${^{n}a}$ recursively as:

$${^{n}a} := \begin{cases} 1 &\text{if }n=0 \\ a^{\left(^{(n-1)}a\right)} &\text{if }n>0. \end{cases}$$

The recursive definition is equivalent to repeated exponentiation for natural heights; however, this definition allows for extensions to the other heights such as $^{0}a$, $^{-1}a$, and $^{i}a$ as well – many of these extensions are areas of active research.

== Terminology ==
There are many terms for tetration, each of which has some logic behind it, but some have not become commonly used for one reason or another. Here is a comparison of each term with its rationale and counter-rationale.

- The term tetration, introduced by Goodstein in his 1947 paper Transfinite Ordinals in Recursive Number Theory (generalizing the recursive base-representation used in Goodstein's theorem to use higher operations), has gained dominance. It was also popularized in Rudy Rucker's Infinity and the Mind.
- The term superexponentiation was published by Bromer in his paper Superexponentiation in 1987. It was used earlier by Ed Nelson in his book Predicative Arithmetic, Princeton University Press, 1986.
- The term hyperpower is a natural combination of hyper and power, which aptly describes tetration. The problem lies in the meaning of hyper with respect to the hyperoperation sequence. When considering hyperoperations, the term hyper refers to all ranks, and the term super refers to rank 4, or tetration. So under these considerations hyperpower is misleading, since it is only referring to tetration.
- The term power tower is occasionally used, in the form "the power tower of order n" for n occurrences of the a variable: ${\ \atop {\ }} {{\underbrace{a^{a^{\cdot^{\cdot^{a}}}}}} \atop n}$. Exponentiation is easily misconstrued: note that the operation of raising to a power is right-associative (see below). That is, tetration is iterated exponentiation starting from the top right side of the expression with an instance $b=a^a$. Exponentiating the next leftward $a$ has one evaluating $c=a^b$, then $d=a^c$, and so on.

Owing in part to some shared terminology and similar notational symbolism, tetration is often confused with closely related functions and expressions. Here are a few related terms:

Terms related to tetration
Terminology	Form
Tetration	$a^{a^{\cdot^{\cdot^{a^a}}}}$
Iterated exponentials	$a^{a^{\cdot^{\cdot^{a^x}}}}$
Nested exponentials (also towers)	$a_1^{a_2^{\cdot^{\cdot^{a_n}}}}$
Infinite exponentials (also towers)	$a_1^{a_2^{a_3^{\cdot^{\cdot^{\cdot}}}}}$

In the first two expressions, a is the base, and the number of times a appears is the height (add one for x). In the third expression, n is the height, but each of the bases is different.

Care must be taken when referring to iterated exponentials, as it is common to call expressions of this form iterated exponentiation, which is ambiguous, as this can either mean iterated powers or iterated exponentials.

The infinite exponential is defined as the limit of the following sequence of finite power towers, provided that the limit exists:

$$a_1,\quad a_1^{a_2},\quad a_1^{a_2^{a_3}},\quad\ldots$$

== Notation ==
There are many different notation styles that can be used to express tetration. Some notations can also be used to describe other hyperoperations, while some are limited to tetration and have no immediate extension.

Notation styles for tetration
Name	Form	Description
Knuth's up-arrow notation	$$\begin{align} a {\uparrow\uparrow} n \\ a {\uparrow}^2 n \end{align}$$	Allows extension by putting more arrows, or, even more powerfully, an indexed arrow.
Conway chained arrow notation	$a \rightarrow n \rightarrow 2$	Allows extension by increasing the number 2 (equivalent with the extensions above), but also, even more powerfully, by extending the chain.
Ackermann function	${}^{n}2 = \operatorname{A}(4, n - 3) + 3$	Allows the special case $a=2$ to be written in terms of the Ackermann function.
Iterated exponential notation	$\exp_a^n(1)$	Allows simple extension to iterated exponentials from initial values other than 1.
Hooshmand notations	$$\begin{align} &\operatorname{uxp}_a n \\[2pt] &a^{\frac{n}{}} \end{align}$$	Used by M. H. Hooshmand [2006].
Hyperoperation notations	$$\begin{align} &a [4] n \\[2pt] &H_4(a, n) \end{align}$$	Allows extension by increasing the number 4; this gives the family of hyperoperations.
Double caret notation	a^^n	Since the up-arrow is used identically to the caret (^), tetration may be written as (^^); convenient for ASCII.

One notation above uses iterated exponential notation; this is defined in general as follows:

$\exp_a^n(x) = a^{a^{\cdot^{\cdot^{a^x}}}}$ with n as.

There are not as many notations for iterated exponentials, but here are a few:

Notation styles for iterated exponentials
Name	Form	Description
Standard notation	$\exp_a^n(x)$	Euler coined the notation $\exp_a(x) = a^x$, and iteration notation $f^n(x)$ has been around about as long.
Knuth's up-arrow notation	$(a{\uparrow})^n x$	Allows for super-powers and super-exponential function by increasing the number of arrows; used in the article on large numbers.
Text notation	exp_a^n(x)	Based on standard notation; convenient for ASCII.
J notation	x^^:(n-1)x	Repeats the exponentiation. See J (programming language).
Infinity barrier notation	$a\uparrow\uparrow n|x$	Jonathan Bowers coined this, and it can be extended to higher hyper-operations.

== Examples ==
Because of the extremely fast growth of tetration, most values in the following table are too large to write in scientific notation. In these cases, iterated exponential notation is used to express them in base 10. The values containing a decimal point are approximate. Usually, the limit that can be calculated in a numerical calculation program such as Wolfram Alpha is 3↑↑4, and the number of digits up to 3↑↑5 can be expressed.

Examples of tetration
$x$	${}^{2}x$	${}^{3}x$	${}^{4}x$	${}^{5}x$	${}^{6}x$	${}^{7}x$
1	1	1	1	1	1	1
2	4 (2^{2})	16 (2^{4})	65,536 (2^{16})	2.00353 × 10^{19,728} (2^{65,536})	$\exp_{10}^3(4.29508)$ (10^{6.03123×10^{19,727}})	$\exp_{10}^4(4.29508)$
3	27 (3^{3})	7,625,597,484,987 (3^{27})	1.25801 × 10^{3,638,334,640,024} (3^{7,625,597,484,987})	$\exp_{10}^4(1.09902)$ (10^{6.00225×10^{3,638,334,640,023}})	$\exp_{10}^5(1.09902)$	$\exp_{10}^6(1.09902)$
4	256 (4^{4})	1.34078 × 10^{154} (4^{256})	$\exp_{10}^3(2.18726)$ (10^{8.07230×10^{153}})	$\exp_{10}^4(2.18726)$	$\exp_{10}^5(2.18726)$	$\exp_{10}^6(2.18726)$
5	3,125 (5^{5})	1.91101 × 10^{2,184} (5^{3,125})	$\exp_{10}^3(3.33928)$ (10^{1.33574×10^{2,184}})	$\exp_{10}^4(3.33928)$	$\exp_{10}^5(3.33928)$	$\exp_{10}^6(3.33928)$
6	46,656 (6^{6})	2.65912 × 10^{36,305} (6^{46,656})	$\exp_{10}^3(4.55997)$ (10^{2.0692×10^{36,305}})	$\exp_{10}^4(4.55997)$	$\exp_{10}^5(4.55997)$	$\exp_{10}^6(4.55997)$
7	823,543 (7^{7})	3.75982 × 10^{695,974} (7^{823,543})	$\exp_{10}^3(5.84259)$ (10^{3.17742×10^{695,974}})	$\exp_{10}^4(5.84259)$	$\exp_{10}^5(5.84259)$	$\exp_{10}^6(5.84259)$
8	16,777,216 (8^{8})	6.01452 × 10^{15,151,335}	$\exp_{10}^3(7.18045)$ (10^{5.43165×10^{15,151,335}})	$\exp_{10}^4(7.18045)$	$\exp_{10}^5(7.18045)$	$\exp_{10}^6(7.18045)$
9	387,420,489 (9^{9})	4.28125 × 10^{369,693,099}	$\exp_{10}^3(8.56784)$ (10^{4.08535×10^{369,693,099}})	$\exp_{10}^4(8.56784)$	$\exp_{10}^5(8.56784)$	$\exp_{10}^6(8.56784)$
10	10,000,000,000 (10^{10})	10^{10,000,000,000}	$\exp_{10}^4(1)$ (10^{10^{10,000,000,000}})	$\exp_{10}^5(1)$	$\exp_{10}^6(1)$	$\exp_{10}^7(1)$

Remark: If x does not differ from 10 by orders of magnitude, then for all $k \ge3,~ ^mx =\exp_{10}^k z,~z>1 ~\Rightarrow~^{m+1}x = \exp_{10}^{k+1} z' \text{ with }z' \approx z$. For example, $z - z' < 1.5\cdot 10^{-15} \text{ for } x = 3 = k,~ m = 4$ in the above table, and the difference is even smaller for the following rows.

== Extensions ==
Tetration can be extended in two different ways; in the formula $^na$, both the base a and the height n can be generalized using the definition and properties of tetration. Although the base and the height can be extended beyond the non-negative integers to different domains, including ${^n 0}$, complex functions such as ${}^{n}i$, and heights of infinite n, the more limited properties of tetration reduce the ability to extend tetration.

=== Extension of domain for bases ===
==== Base zero ====
The exponential $0^0$ is not consistently defined. Thus, the tetrations ${^{n}0}$ are not clearly defined by the formula given earlier. However, $\lim_{x\rightarrow0} {}^{n}x$ is well defined, and exists:

$$\lim_{x\rightarrow0} {}^{n}x = \begin{cases}
1, & n \text{ even} \\
0, & n \text{ odd.}
\end{cases}$$

Thus we could consistently define ${}^{n}0 = \lim_{x\rightarrow 0} {}^{n}x$. This is analogous to defining $0^0 = 1$.

Under this extension, ${}^{0}0 = 1$, so the rule ${^{0}a} = 1$ from the original definition still holds.

==== Complex bases ====
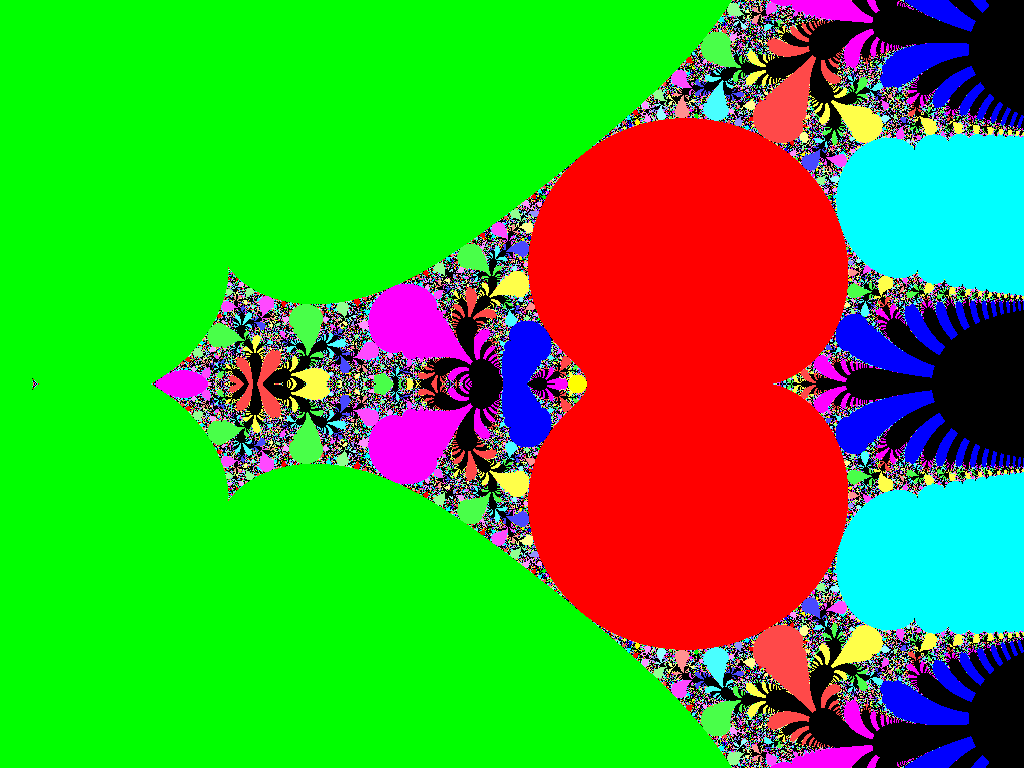
Tetration by period

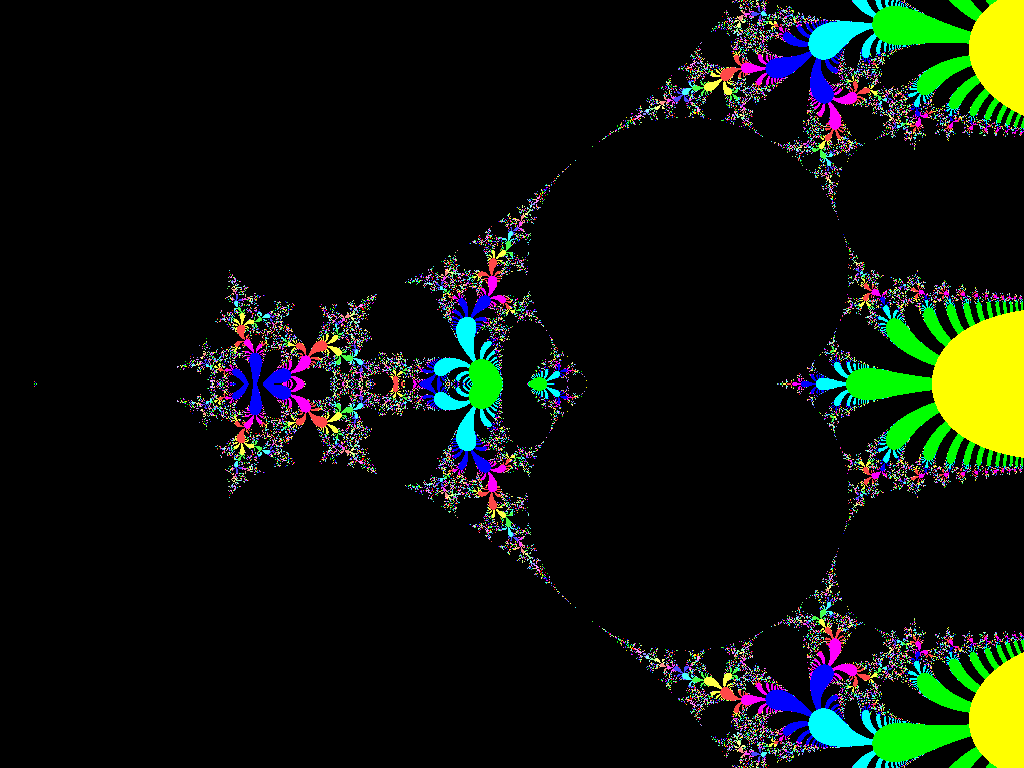
Tetration by escape

Since complex numbers can be raised to powers, tetration can be applied to bases of the form z = a + bi (where a and b are real). For example, in ^{n}z with z = i, tetration is achieved by using the principal branch of the natural logarithm; using Euler's formula we get the relation

$$i^{a+bi} = e^{\frac{1}{2}{\pi i} (a + bi)} = e^{-\frac{1}{2}{\pi b}} \left(\cos{\frac{\pi a}{2}} + i \sin{\frac{\pi a}{2}}\right).$$

This suggests a recursive definition for ^{n+1}i = a′ + b′i given any ^{n}i = a + bi:

$$\begin{align}
a' &= e^{-\frac{1}{2}{\pi b}} \cos{\frac{\pi a}{2}} \\[2pt]
b' &= e^{-\frac{1}{2}{\pi b}} \sin{\frac{\pi a}{2}}
\end{align}$$

The following approximate values can be derived:

Values of tetration of complex bases
${}^{n}i$	Approximate value
${}^{1}i = i$	i
${}^{2}i = i^{\left({}^{1}i\right)}$	0.2079
${}^{3}i = i^{\left({}^{2}i\right)}$	0.9472 + 0.3208i
${}^{4}i = i^{\left({}^{3}i\right)}$	0.0501 + 0.6021i
${}^{5}i = i^{\left({}^{4}i\right)}$	0.3872 + 0.0305i
${}^{6}i = i^{\left({}^{5}i\right)}$	0.7823 + 0.5446i
${}^{7}i = i^{\left({}^{6}i\right)}$	0.1426 + 0.4005i
${}^{8}i = i^{\left({}^{7}i\right)}$	0.5198 + 0.1184i
${}^{9}i = i^{\left({}^{8}i\right)}$	0.5686 + 0.6051i

Solving the inverse relation, as in the previous section, yields the expected ^{0}i = 1 and ^{−1}i = 0, with negative values of n giving infinite results on the imaginary axis. Plotted in the complex plane, the entire sequence spirals to the limit 0.4383 + 0.3606i, which could be interpreted as the value where n is infinite.

Such tetration sequences have been studied since the time of Euler, but are poorly understood due to their chaotic behavior. Most published research historically has focused on the convergence of the infinitely iterated exponential function. Current research has greatly benefited from the advent of powerful computers with fractal and symbolic mathematics software. Much of what is known about tetration comes from general knowledge of complex dynamics and specific research of the exponential map.

=== Extensions of the domain for different heights ===
==== Infinite heights ====
$\textstyle \lim_{n\rightarrow \infty} {}^nx$ of the infinitely iterated exponential converges for the bases $\textstyle \left(e^{-1}\right)^e \le x \le e^{\left(e^{-1}\right)}$

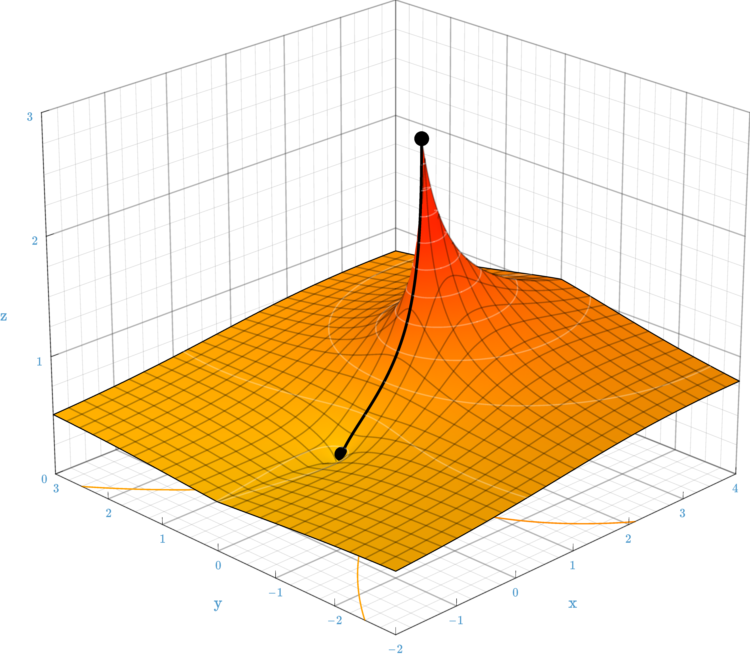
The function $\left| \frac{\mathrm{W}(-\ln{z})}{-\ln{z}} \right|$ on the complex plane, showing the real-valued infinitely iterated exponential function (black curve)

Tetration can be extended to infinite heights; i.e., for certain a values in ${}^{n}a$, there exists a well-defined result for an infinite n. This is because for bases within a certain interval, tetration converges to a finite value as the height tends to infinity. For example, $\sqrt{2}^{\sqrt{2}^{\sqrt{2}^{\cdot^{\cdot^{\cdot}}}}}$ converges to 2, and can therefore be said to equal 2. The trend towards 2 can be seen by evaluating a small finite tower:

$$\begin{align}
\sqrt{2}^{\sqrt{2}^{\sqrt{2}^{\sqrt{2}^{\sqrt{2}^{1.414}}}}}
&\approx \sqrt{2}^{\sqrt{2}^{\sqrt{2}^{\sqrt{2}^{1.63}}}} \\
&\approx \sqrt{2}^{\sqrt{2}^{\sqrt{2}^{1.76}}} \\
&\approx \sqrt{2}^{\sqrt{2}^{1.84}} \\
&\approx \sqrt{2}^{1.89} \\
&\approx 1.93
\end{align}$$

In general, the infinitely iterated exponential $x^{x^{\cdot^{\cdot^{\cdot}}}}$ is defined as the limit of ${}^n x$ as $n$ goes to infinity. It converges for e^{−e} ≤ x ≤ e^{1/e}, roughly the interval from 0.066 to 1.44, a result shown by Leonhard Euler. The limit y, should it exist, is a positive real solution of the equation y = x^{y}. Thus, x = y^{1/y}. The limit defining the infinite exponential of x does not exist when x > e^{1/e} because the maximum of y^{1/y} is e^{1/e}. The limit also fails to exist when 0 < x < e^{−e}.

This may be extended to complex numbers z with the definition:

$${}^{\infty}z = z^{z^{\cdot^{\cdot^{\cdot}}}} = e^{-\mathrm{W}(-\ln{z})} = \frac{\mathrm{W}(-\ln{z})}{-\ln{z}} ~,$$

where W represents Lambert's W function. This formula follows from the assumption that $z^{z^{\cdot^{\cdot^{\cdot}}}}= a$ converges, and thus $z^a = a$, $z = a^{1/a}$, $1/z = (1/a)^{1/a} = {}^2(1/a)$, and $1/a = \mathrm{ssrt}(1/z) = e^{W(\ln(1/z))}$ (see square super-root below).

As the limit y = ^{∞}x (if existent on the positive real line, i.e. for e^{−e} ≤ x ≤ e^{1/e}) must satisfy x^{y} = y, we see that x ↦ y = ^{∞}x is (the lower branch of) the inverse function of y ↦ x = y^{1/y}.

For a sequence of positive real numbers $a_n$, the infinite exponential $a_1^{a_2^{a_3^{\cdot^{\cdot^{\cdot}}}}}$ converges if $e^{-e}\leq a_n\leq e^{1/e}$ for all sufficiently large $n$.

==== Negative heights ====
We can reverse the recursive rule for tetration,

$${^{k+1}a} = a^{\left({^{k}a}\right)},$$

to write

$$^{k}a = \log_a \left(^{k+1}a\right).$$

Substituting −1 for k gives

${}^{-1}a = \log_{a} \left({}^0 a\right) = \log_a 1 = 0$.

Smaller negative values cannot be well defined in this way. Substituting −2 for k in the same equation gives

$${}^{-2}a = \log_{a} \left( {}^{-1}a \right) = \log_a 0 = -\infty,$$

which is not well defined. They can, however, sometimes be considered sets.

For $a = 1$, any definition of ${^{-1}a}$ is consistent with the rule. Specifically, ${^{-1}1}$ could be any value $z$ because

${^{0}1} = 1 = 1^z$ for any $z = {^{-1}1}$.

==== Linear approximation for real heights ====
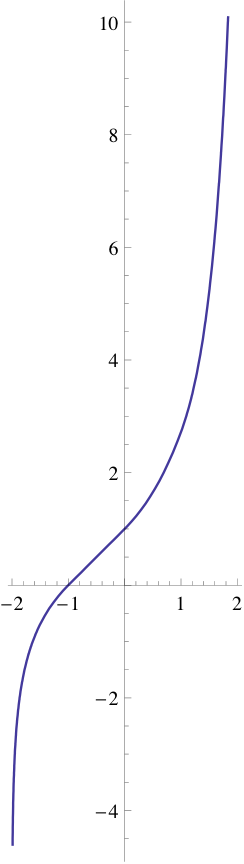
${^{x}}e$ using linear approximation

A linear approximation (solution to the continuity requirement, approximation to the differentiability requirement) is given by:

$${}^{x}a \approx \begin{cases}
\log_a\left(^{x+1}a\right) &  x \le -1 \\
1 + x & -1 < x \le 0 \\
a^{\left(^{x-1}a\right)} &  0 < x
\end{cases}$$

hence:

Linear approximation values
Approximation	Domain
${}^x a \approx x + 1$	for −1 < x < 0
${}^x a \approx a^x$	for 0 < x < 1
${}^x a \approx a^{a^{(x-1)}}$	for 1 < x < 2

and so on. However, it is only piecewise differentiable; at integer values of x, the derivative is multiplied by $\ln{a}$. It is continuously differentiable for $x > -2$ if and only if $a = e$. For example, using these methods ${}^\frac{\pi}{2}e \approx 5.868...$ and ${}^{-4.3}0.5 \approx 4.03335...$

A main theorem in Hooshmand's paper states: Let $0 < a \neq 1$. If $f:(-2, +\infty)\rightarrow \mathbb{R}$ is continuous and satisfies the conditions:

- $f(x) = a^{f(x-1)}$ for all $x > -1$ and $f(0) = 1,$
- $f$ is differentiable on (−1, 0),
- $f^\prime$ is a nondecreasing or nonincreasing function on (−1, 0), and
- $f^\prime\!\!\left(0^+\right) = (\ln a) f^\prime\!\!\left(0^-\right) \text{ or } f^\prime\!\!\left(-1^+\right) = f^\prime\!\!\left(0^-\right),$

then $f$ is uniquely determined through the equation

$f(x) = \exp^{\lfloor x\rfloor}_a \left(a^{\{x\}}\right) = \exp^{\lfloor x \rfloor +1}_a(\{x\})$ for all $x > -2,$

where $\{x\} = x - \lfloor x \rfloor$ denotes the fractional part of x and $\exp^{\lfloor x \rfloor}_a$ is the $\lfloor x \rfloor$-iterated function of the function $\exp_a$.

The proof is that the second through fourth conditions trivially imply that f is a linear function on [−1, 0].

The linear approximation to natural tetration function ${}^xe$ is continuously differentiable, but its second derivative does not exist at integer values of its argument. Hooshmand derived another uniqueness theorem for it which states:

If $f: (-2, +\infty)\rightarrow \mathbb{R}$ is a continuous function that satisfies

- $f(x) = e^{f(x-1)}$ for all $x > -1$ and $f(0) = 1$,
- $f$ is convex on (−1, 0), and
- $f^\prime \left(0^-\right) \leq f^\prime \left(0^+\right)$,

then $f = \text{uxp}$. (Here $f = \text{uxp}$ is Hooshmand's name for the linear approximation to the natural tetration function.)

The proof is much the same as before; the recursion equation ensures that $f^\prime (-1^+) = f^\prime (0^+),$ and then the convexity condition implies that $f$ is linear on (−1, 0).

Therefore, the linear approximation to natural tetration is the only solution of the equation $f(x) = e^{f(x-1)}$ for $x > -1$ and $f(0) = 1$ which is convex on (−1, +∞). All other sufficiently-differentiable solutions must have an inflection point on the interval (−1, 0).

==== Higher-order approximations for real heights ====
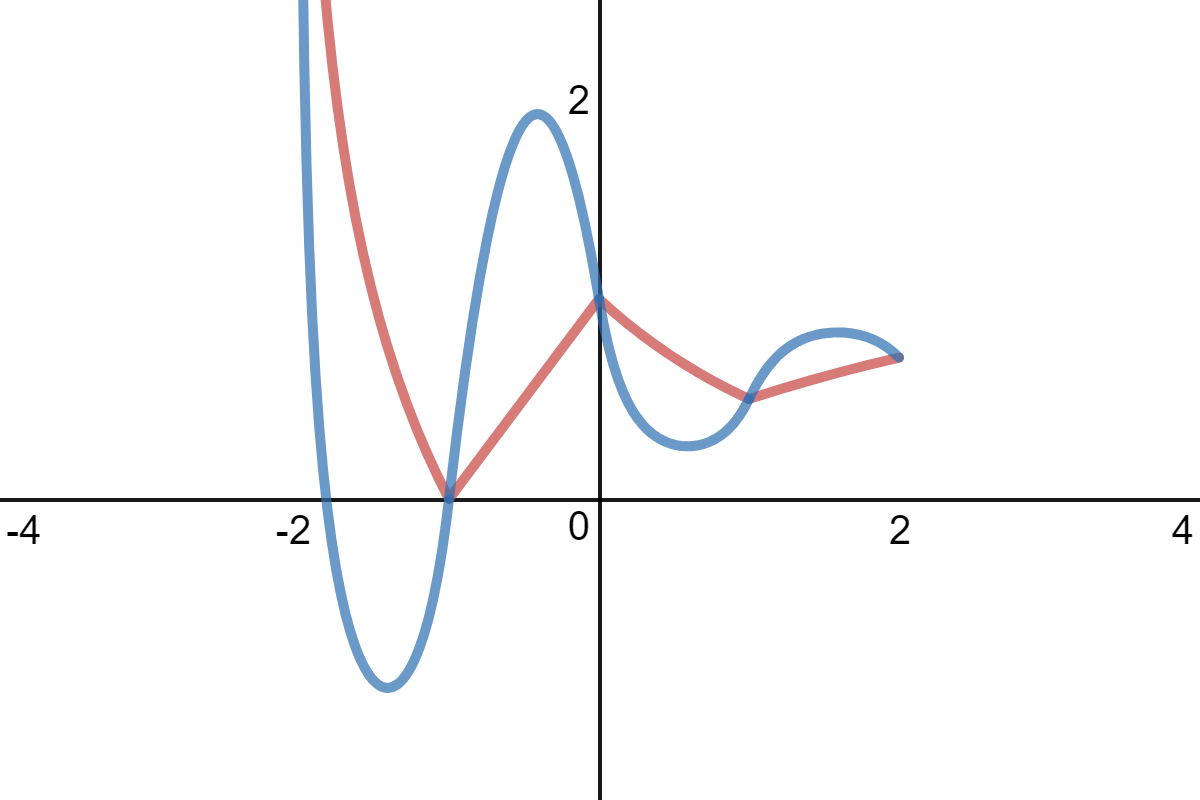
Comparison of the linear and quadratic approximations (in red and blue respectively) of the function $^{x}0.5$, from x = −2 to x = 2

Beyond linear approximations, a quadratic approximation (to the differentiability requirement) is given by:

$${}^{x}a \approx \begin{cases}
\log_a\left({}^{x+1}a\right) & x \le -1 \\
1 + \frac{2\ln(a)}{1 + \ln(a)}x - \frac{1 - \ln(a)}{1 + \ln(a)}x^2 & -1 < x \le 0 \\
a^{\left({}^{x-1}a\right)} & x >0,
\end{cases}$$

which is differentiable for all $x > 0$, but not twice-differentiable. For example, ${}^\frac{1}{2}2 \approx 1.45933...$ If $a = e$, then this is the same as the linear approximation.

Because of the way it is calculated, this function does not "cancel out", contrary to exponents, where $\left(a^\frac{1}{n}\right)^n = a$. Namely,

$${}^n\left({}^\frac{1}{n} a\right)
= \underbrace{
\left({}^\frac{1}{n}a\right)^{
\left({}^\frac{1}{n}a\right)^{
\cdot^{\cdot^{\cdot^{\cdot^{
\left({}^\frac{1}{n}a\right)
}}}}
}
}
}_n
\neq a$$.

Just as there is a quadratic approximation, cubic approximations and methods for generalizing to approximations of degree n also exist, although they are much more unwieldy.

=== Complex heights ===
Drawing of the analytic extension $f = F(x+{\rm i}y)$ of tetration to the complex plane. Levels $|f| = 1, e^{\pm 1}, e^{\pm 2}, \ldots$ and levels $\arg(f) = 0, \pm 1, \pm 2, \ldots$ are shown with thick curves.

In 2017, it was proved that there exists a unique function $F$ satisfying $F(z + 1) = \exp\bigl(F(z)\bigr)$ (equivalently $F(z+1) = b^{F(z)}$ when $b=e$), with the auxiliary conditions $F(0) = 1$ and $F(z) \to \xi_{\pm}$ (the attracting/repelling fixed points of the logarithm, roughly $0.318 \pm 1.337\,\mathrm{i}$) as $z \to \pm i\infty$. Moreover, $F$ is holomorphic on all of $\mathbb{C}$ except for the cut along the real axis at $z \le -2$. This construction was first conjectured by Kouznetsov (2009) and rigorously carried out by Kneser in 1950. Paulsen & Cowgill's proof extends Kneser's original construction to any base $b>e^{1/e}\approx1.445$, and subsequent work showed how to extend this result to all complex bases, including those inside the region where $\lim_{n \rightarrow \infty} {}^n b$ converges.

== Non-elementary recursiveness ==
Tetration (restricted to $\mathbb{N}^2$) is not an elementary recursive function. One can prove by induction that for every elementary recursive function f, there is a constant c such that

$$f(x) \leq \exp_a^c (x).$$

We denote the right hand side by $g(c, x)$. Suppose on the contrary that tetration is elementary recursive. Then $g(x, x)+1$ is also elementary recursive. By the above inequality, there is a constant c such that $g(x,x) +1 \leq g(c, x)$. By letting $x=c$, we have that $g(c,c) + 1 \leq g(c, c)$, a contradiction.

== Inverse operations ==
Exponentiation has two inverse operations: roots and logarithms. Analogously, the inverses of tetration are often called the super-root, and the super-logarithm (In fact, all hyperoperations of order 3 or higher have analogous inverses); for example, in the function ${^3}y=x$, the two inverses are the cube super-root of y and the super-logarithm base y of x.

=== Super-root ===
The super-root is the inverse operation of tetration with respect to the base: if $^n y = x$, then y is an n-th super-root of x ($\sqrt[n]{x}_s$ or $\sqrt[4]{x}_s$).

For example,

$$^4 2 = 2^{2^{2^{2}}} = 65536$$

so 2 is the fourth super-root of 65536 $\left(\sqrt[4]{65{,}536}_s =2\right)$.

==== Square super-root ====
Graph of $y = \sqrt{x}_s$

The 2nd-order super-root, square super-root, or super square root has two equivalent notations, $\mathrm{ssrt}(x)$ and $\sqrt{x}_s$. It is the inverse of $^2 x = x^x$ and can be represented with the Lambert W function:

$\mathrm{ssrt}(x)=\exp(W(\ln x))=\frac{\ln x}{W(\ln x)}$ or
$$\sqrt{x}_s=e^{W(\ln x)}$$

The function also illustrates the reflective nature of the root and logarithm functions, as the equation below only holds true when $y = \mathrm{ssrt}(x)$:

$$\sqrt[y]{x} = \log_y x.$$

Like square roots, the square super-root of x may not have a single solution. Unlike square roots, determining the number of square super-roots of x may be difficult. In general, if $e^{-1/e}<x<1$, then x has two positive square super-roots between 0 and 1, calculated as

$\sqrt{x}_s=\left\{e^{W_{-1}(\ln x)};e^{W_{0}(\ln x)}\right\},$

and if $x > 1$, then x has one positive square super-root greater than 1 calculated as $\sqrt{x}_s=e^{W_{0}(\ln x)}$. If x is positive and less than $e^{-1/e}$, then it does not have any real square super-roots, but the formula given above yields countably infinitely many complex ones for any finite x not equal to 1. The function has been used to determine the size of data clusters.

At $x = 1$:

$$\mathrm{ssrt}(x) = 1 + (x-1) -(x-1)^2 + \frac{3}{2} (x-1)^3 - \frac{17}{6} (x-1)^4 + \frac{37}{6}(x-1)^5 - \frac{1759}{120}(x-1)^6 + \frac{13279}{360} (x-1)^7 + \mathcal O {\left((x-1)^8 \right)}$$

==== Other super-roots ====
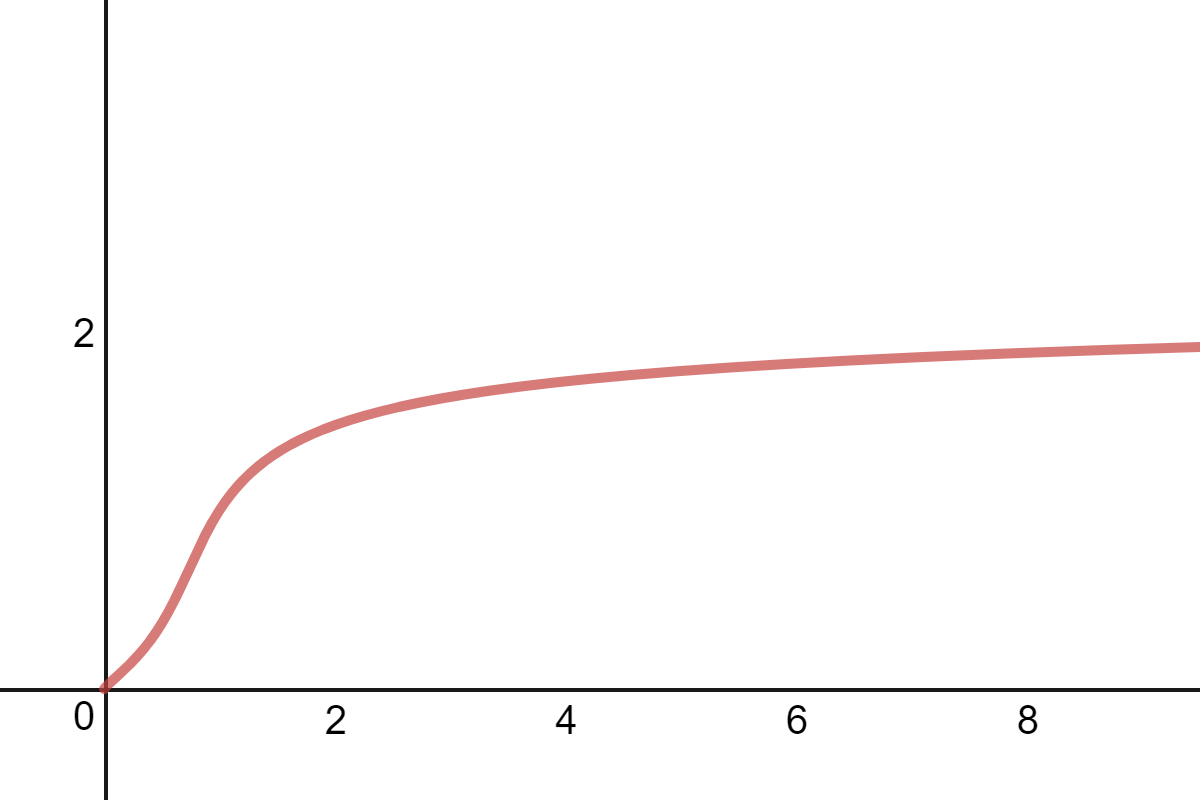
The graph $y=\sqrt[3]{x}_s$

One of the simpler and faster formulas for a third-degree super-root is the recursive formula. If $y = x^{x^x}$ then one can use:

- $x_0 = 1$
- $x_{n+1} = \exp(W(W(x_n\ln y)))$

This recursive formula makes use of the explicit representation of the square super-root via the Lambert W function given above, as we can represent $y = x^{x^x}$ in the form of $y^x = (x^x)^{(x^x)}$ and apply the square super-root twice: $x = \mathrm{ssrt}(\mathrm{ssrt}(y^x))$.

For each integer n > 2, the function ^{n}x is defined and increasing for x ≥ 1, and ^{n}1 = 1, so that the n-th super-root of x, $\sqrt[n]{x}_s$, exists for x ≥ 1.

However, if the linear approximation above is used, then $^y x = y + 1$ if −1 < y ≤ 0, so $^y \sqrt{y + 1}_s$ cannot exist.

In the same way as the square super-root, terminology for other super-roots can be based on the normal roots: "cube super-roots" can be expressed as $\sqrt[3]{x}_s$, the "fourth super-root" can be expressed as $\sqrt[4]{x}_s$, and the "n-th super-root" is $\sqrt[n]{x}_s$. Note that $\sqrt[n]{x}_s$ may not be uniquely defined, because there may be more than one n^{th} root. For example, x has a single (real) super-root if n is odd, and up to two if n is even.

Just as with the extension of tetration to infinite heights, the super-root can be extended to n = ∞, being well-defined if 1/e ≤ x ≤ e. Note that $x = {^\infty y} = y^{\left[^\infty y\right]} = y^x,$ and thus that $y = x^{1/x}$. Therefore, when it is well defined, $\sqrt[\infty]{x}_s = x^{1/x}$ and, unlike normal tetration, is an elementary function. For example, $\sqrt[\infty]{2}_s = 2^{1/2} = \sqrt{2}$.

It follows from the Gelfond–Schneider theorem that super-root $\sqrt{n}_s$ for any positive integer n is either integer or transcendental, and $\sqrt[3]{n}_s$ is either integer or irrational. It is still an open question whether irrational super-roots are transcendental in the latter case.

=== Super-logarithm ===
Once a continuous increasing (in x) definition of tetration, ^{x}a, is selected, the corresponding super-logarithm $\operatorname{slog}_ax$ or $\log^4_ax$ is defined for all real numbers x, and a > 1.

The function slog_{a} x satisfies:

$$\begin{align}
\operatorname{slog}_a {^x a} &= x \\
\operatorname{slog}_a a^x &= 1 + \operatorname{slog}_a x \\
\operatorname{slog}_a x &= 1 + \operatorname{slog}_a \log_a x \\
\operatorname{slog}_a x &\geq -2
\end{align}$$

== Open questions ==
Other than the problems with the extensions of tetration, there are several open questions concerning tetration, particularly when concerning the relations between number systems such as integers and irrational numbers:

- It is not known whether there is an integer $n \ge 4$ for which ^{n}π is an integer, because we can not calculate precisely enough the numbers of digits after the decimal points of $\pi$. It is similar for ^{n}e for $n \ge 5$, as we are not aware of any other methods besides some direct computation. In fact, since $\log_{10}(e) \cdot {}^{3}e > 1656520$, then ${}^{4}e > 2\cdot 10^{1656520}$. Given ${}^{3}\pi < 1.35\cdot 10^{18} \ll 10^{1656520}$ and $\pi < e^2$, then ${}^{4}\pi < {}^{n}e$ for $n \ge 5$. It is believed that ^{n}e is not an integer for any positive integer n, due to the algebraic independence of $e, {}^{2}e, {}^{3}e, \dots$, given Schanuel's conjecture.
- It is not known whether ^{n}q is rational for any positive integer n and positive non-integer rational q. For example, it is not known whether the positive root of the equation ^{4}x = 2 is rational.
- It is not known whether ^{e}π or ^{π}e (defined using Kneser's extension) are rationals or not.

== Applications ==
For each graph H on h vertices and each ε > 0, define

$$D=2\uparrow\uparrow5h^4\log(1/\varepsilon).$$

Then each graph G on n vertices with at most n^{h}/D copies of H can be made H-free by removing at most εn^{2} edges.

== See also ==
- Ackermann function
- Big O notation
- Double exponential function
- Hyperoperation
- Iterated logarithm
- Symmetric level-index arithmetic
