= Grupo Taller de Estocolmo =

The Grupo Taller de Estocolmo (Stockholm Workshop Group) was an assembly of Chilean writers founded in 1977, in Sweden, by the poets Sergio Infante, Adrián Santini, Carlos Geywitz, later joined by Sergio Badilla Castillo, and the prose writer Edgardo Mardones.

== History ==
The Grupo Taller de Estocolmo had a leading role in the diffusion of Chilean and Hispano-American Literature during the final decades of the 20th century in Scandinavia. It was supported by the Swedish writer Sun Axelsson, who served as a link with the intellectual circles in the Nordic countries for the exiled writers who had arrived in the Swedish capital.

Some of the most important books of each of the five writers who were part of the Grupo Taller were produced during this time of joint creativity, including: Sobre exilios by Sergio Infante, Después del centauro by Adrian Santini, the El ojo de la ira by Carlos Geywitz, La morada del signo of Sergio Badilla Castillo, and Caperucita esperando al lobo by Edgardo Mardones.

In 1991, Infante, Badilla, Santini and Geywitz, were included in the first Chilean poetry anthology in Swedish: Bevingade Lejon. (Winged Lion), published by the largest book publishing company in Sweden, namely Bonniers Förlag, edited and translated by Sun Axelsson, with translation by Marina Torres, Leif Duprez y Sören Persson.

This literary community ended its activities definitively at the end of the eighties.
