= Sergio Infante =

Chilean writer

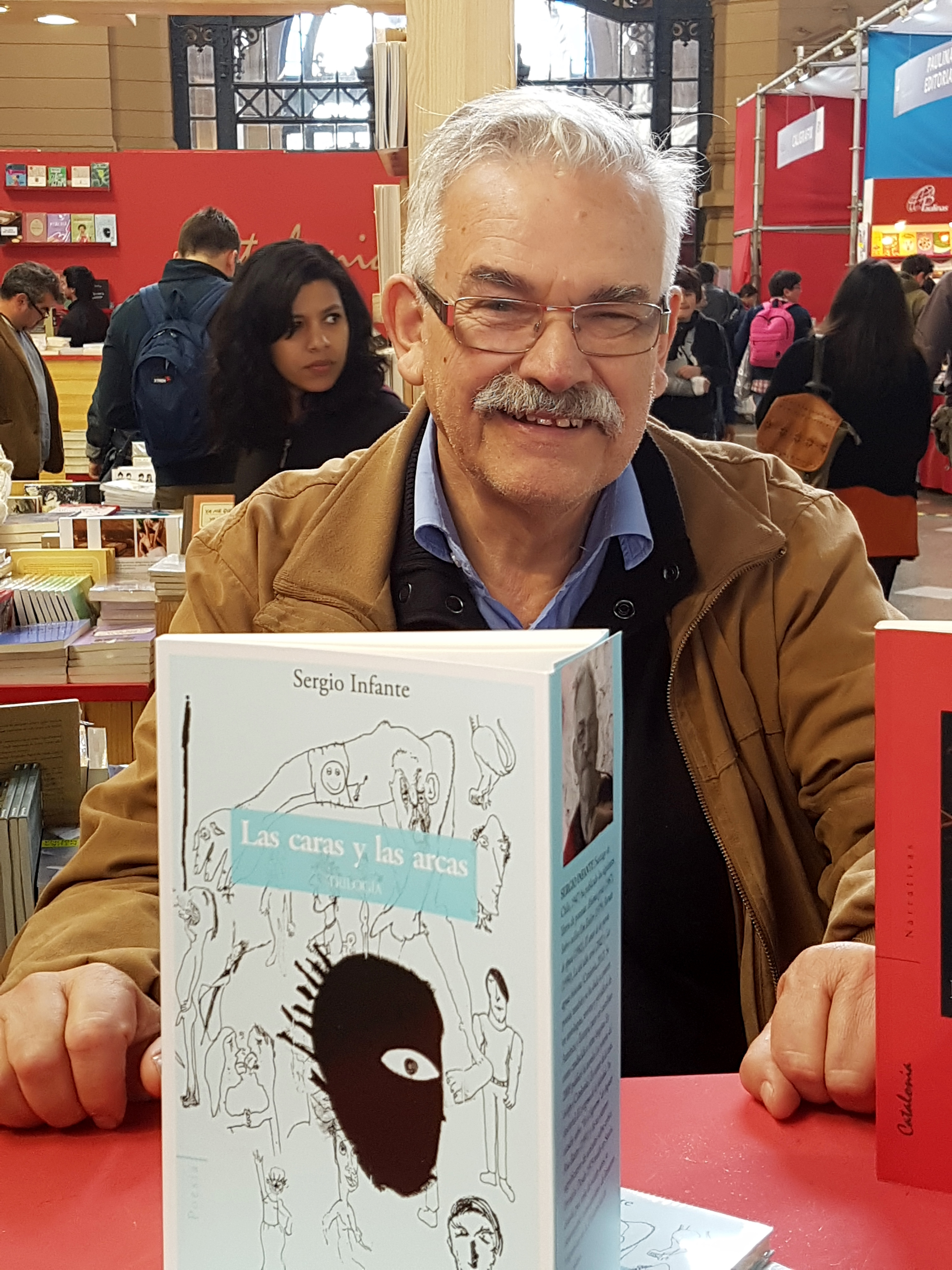
Infante at the Santiago International Book Fair 2017

Sergio Infante (born May 1, 1947, in Santiago de Chile) is a Chilean poet, essayist, university professor and writer, who resides in Sweden.

== Life ==
In the late 60s, Sergio Infante led an intense cultural life in the artistic circles of the Chilean capital, and at the same time studied at the School of Fine Arts of Santiago. During that period infante published his first collection of poems: Gray Abysses (1967). Due to his social commitment and because of the prevailing political climate in Chile, he took a leave from his art studies and moved from Santiago to Chiloe Island, located in southern Chile.

Infante was living in Chiloe when the military coup of 1973 led by General Augusto Pinochet occurred. He was forced into exile, and left Chile for Argentina. In Buenos Aires Infante stayed just for a few months and continued his way to Sweden where he got refugee status in 1975.

In 1977, Sergio Infante, together with his countrymen, poets Adrian Santini, and Carlos Geywitz founded the lyrical Group Taller of Stockholm, which would also include, another Chilean poet Sergio Badilla Castillo, in 1978.

In the late 80s, Sergio Infante, by that time Doctor in Spanish and Latin American Literature, became professor at the Department of Spanish, Portuguese and Latin American Studies at Stockholm University.

== Bibliography ==
- Abismos grises/Gray Abysses (1967), Poetry
- Exilios / Exiles (1979), Poetry
- Retrato de Época/Portrait of an Epoch (1982) Poetry
- El amor de los parias / Love of the pariahs (1990). Poetry
- El estigma de la falsedad /Stigma of Falseness (1991). Essay
- La del Alba Sería /The one from dawn would be. RIL Editors, Santiago de Chile, (2002) Poetry.
- Los rebaños del cíclope, Santiago de Chile, (2008). Novel.
