= White Light (novel) =

1980 novel by Rudy Rucker

- First edition (UK)
- Author: Rudy Rucker
- Language: English
- Genre: Science fiction novel
- Publisher: Virgin Books UK); Ace Books (US)
- Publication date: Sep 1980 (Virgin); Nov 1980 (Ace)
- Publication place: United States
- Media type: Print
- Pages: 128
- ISBN: 0-907080-01-4
- OCLC: 36954503
- Dewey Decimal: 813/.54 21
- LC Class: PS3568.U298 W47 1997

White Light is a work of science fiction by Rudy Rucker published in 1980 by Virgin Books in the UK and Ace Books in the US. It was written while Rucker was teaching mathematics at the University of Heidelberg from 1978 to 1980, at roughly the same time he was working on the non-fiction book Infinity and the Mind.

On one level, the book is an exploration of the mathematics of infinity through fiction, in much the same way the novel Flatland: A Romance of Many Dimensions explored the concept of multiple dimensions. More specifically, White Light uses an imaginary universe to elucidate the set theory concept of aleph numbers, which are more or less the idea that some infinities are bigger than others.

== Plot summary ==
The book is the story of Felix Rayman, a down-and-out mathematics teacher at SUCAS (a state college in New York, a play on SUNY) with a troubled family life and dead-in-the-water career. In the fictional town of Bernho (Geneseo), he begins experimenting with lucid dreaming—aided by "fuzz weed" (marijuana)—hoping to gain insight into Cantor's continuum hypothesis.

During an out-of-body experience, Felix loses his physical body and nearly falls victim to the Devil, who hunts the Earth for souls like his to take to Hell; Felix calls upon Jesus, who saves him. Jesus asks Felix to do him a favor: to take a restless ghost named Kathy to a place called "Cimön", and bring her to God/Absolute Infinite, which can be found there.

Cimön is permeated with the notion of infinity in its various guises: just getting there involves grappling with infinity, as Cimön is an infinite distance away from Earth. Felix and Kathy get there in their astral bodies by doubling their speed in half the time so that they asymptotically approach infinite speed at four hours. Eventually, at the speed of light, they turn into the eponymous "white light" and merge with Cimön.

In this new world, Felix encounters famous scientists and mathematicians such as Albert Einstein and Georg Cantor, who all reside in a hotel that is based on Hilbert's paradox of the Grand Hotel. Felix stays there after Kathy leaves him; the hotel is full, but Felix has the desk clerk move everybody one room up, leaving an empty room for him.

He falls in with a loquacious beetle named "Franx", reminiscent of Franz Kafka's The Metamorphosis, which is mentioned in Rucker's Afterword. The two decide to climb "Mount On", which itself is infinite (not aleph-null infinite, but perhaps instead cardinality of the continuum or greater).

After many adventures, Franx and Felix find Kathy. They leave off climbing Mount On, and instead try the other side of Cimön, the Deserts, littered with portholes to Hell. Felix merges with the Absolute Infinite, but Kathy is scared and refuses.

Eventually, Felix wakes back up on Earth in his body; everybody attributes his dreams to a spectacular binge-drinking and marijuana-smoking episode, until Felix remembers an insight he had regarding the continuum hypothesis: if there were three basic kinds of existence, that of solid matter, aether, and things he calls bloogs which are not aleph-null or c infinitely divisible, but a higher infinity, then the hypothesis will have been disproven.

With the aid of a physicist friend, he uses his astral travelling abilities to create a ball of this bloog-matter. The ball has unusual properties such as ignoring gravity or being indivisible, or to be more precise, being a physical instantiation of the Banach–Tarski paradox, which means it can be broken apart into multiple pieces, each of which is exactly like the original. It is implied the US government suppresses their research.

== Reception ==
Thomas M. Disch praised White Light as "a good, intelligent, powerful novel," describing it as "a sort of cross between Raymond Chandler and Lewis Carroll (another mathematicizing fabulist) with a tip of the hat along the way to Franz Kafka."

White Light was included as Number 73 in David Pringle's 1988 book, Modern Fantasy: The Hundred Best Novels. Pringle writes, "Funny, flippant, and staggeringly inventive, White Light is a delightful Alice in Wonderland for our times, packed with incident and paradox and grotesque characters."

== Transrealism ==
The main character is a transrealist interpretation of Rucker's life in the 1970s. (Rucker taught mathematics at the State University College at Geneseo, New York from 1972 to 1978.) As such, though the character is fictional, he bears some exaggerated resemblance to Rucker's interpretation of himself at the time. Rucker tells John Shirley in the introduction to recent editions, "I have never really left my body and gone to infinity's Heaven."
