= John Walker (programmer) =

Computer programmer and founder of Autodesk (1949–2024)

- Born: John Wallace Walker; May 16, 1949; Baltimore, Maryland, U.S.
- Died: February 2, 2024 (aged 74); Neuchâtel, Switzerland
- Education: Case Western Reserve University (BS)
- Occupations: Programmer; businessman; author
- Known for: Autodesk, AutoCAD
- Spouse: Roxie Smail (m. 1973)
- Website: fourmilab.ch

John Wallace Walker (May 16, 1949 – February 2, 2024) was an American computer programmer, author and co-founder of the computer-aided design software company Autodesk. He was later recognized for his writing on his website Fourmilab.

== Early projects ==
Walker was born in Baltimore, Maryland on May 16, 1949. He studied electrical engineering at Case Western Reserve University. In 1974/1975, Walker wrote the ANIMAL software, which self-replicated on UNIVAC 1100 machines. It is considered one of the first computer viruses.

Walker also founded the hardware integration manufacturing company Marinchip. Among other things, Marinchip pioneered the translation of numerous computer language compilers to Intel platforms.

== Autodesk ==
In 1982, John Walker and 12 other programmers pooled US$59,000 to start Autodesk, and began working on several computer applications. The first completed was AutoCAD, a software application for computer-aided design (CAD) and drafting. AutoCAD had begun life as Interact, a CAD program, written by programmer Michael Riddle in a proprietary language. Walker and Riddle rewrote the program, and established a profit-sharing agreement for any product derived from InteractCAD. Walker subsequently paid Riddle US$10 million for all the rights.

The company went public in 1985. By mid-1986, the company had grown to 255 employees with annual sales of over $40 million. That year, Walker resigned as chairman and president of the company, continuing to work as a programmer. In 1989, Walker's book, The Autodesk File, was published. It describes his experiences at Autodesk, based around internal documents (particularly email) of the company.

Walker moved to Switzerland in 1991. By 1994, when he resigned from the company, it was the sixth-largest personal computer software company in the world, primarily from the sales of AutoCAD. Walker owned more than 850,000 shares of Autodesk at the time of his departure, worth about $45.8 million at the time ($99,486,978 adjusted for inflation).

== Fourmilab ==
He published on his personal domain, "Fourmi Lab", designed to be a play on Fermilab and Fourmi, French for “ant”, one of his early interests. On his Web site, Walker published about his personal projects, including a hardware random number generator called HotBits, along with software that he wrote and freely distributed, such as his Earth and Moon viewer. Another notable book was called The Hacker's Diet.

== The digital imprimatur ==
Among other things, he is noted for a frequently cited article entitled The Digital Imprimatur: How big brother and big media can put the Internet genie back in the bottle, an article about Internet censorship written in 2003. It was published in the magazine Knowledge, Technology & Policy. In the article, Walker argues that there is increasing pressure limiting the ability for Internet users to voice their ideas, as well as predicting further Internet censorship. Walker said that the most likely candidate to usher what he calls "the digital imprimatur" is digital rights management, or DRM.

== Personal life and death ==
Walker married Roxie Smail in 1973. They moved to Switzerland in 1991. He died of head injuries sustained after a fall at home on February 2, 2024, in Neuchâtel, Switzerland, at the age of 74. He was survived by his wife Roxie.

== In popular culture ==
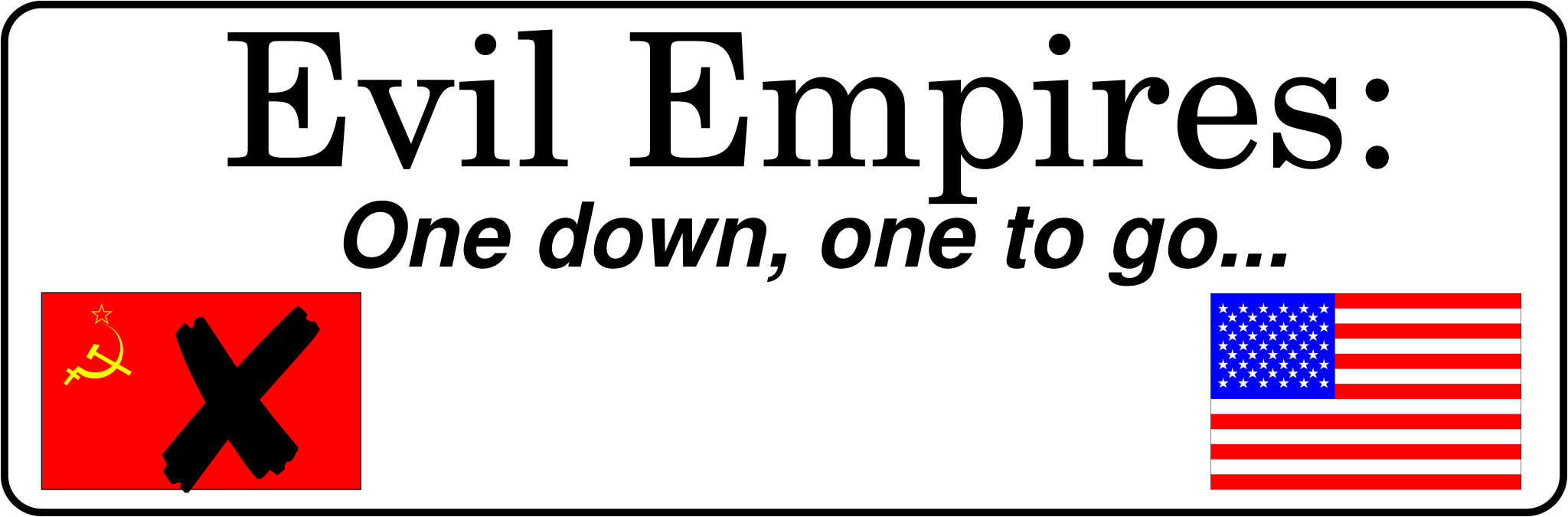
A famous "Evil Empires" (USSR and US) bumper sticker made by J. Walker. It was first published in July 1990.

Walker's interest in artificial life prompted him to hire Rudy Rucker, a mathematician and science fiction author, for work on cellular automata software. Rucker later drew from his experience at Autodesk in Silicon Valley for his novel The Hacker and the Ants, in which one of the characters is loosely based on John Walker.

== See also ==
- The Right to Read
- Amazon Kindle remote deletion controversy
