= Spaceland (disambiguation) =

Spaceland may refer to:

Places

- Houston Gulf Airport (IATA airport code: SPX; ICAO airport code: KSPX), League City, Texas, USA; formerly named Spaceland Airport
- Spaceland, a nightclub in Los Angeles, California, USA

Literature

- Spaceland, a fictional location from the 1884 science fiction novel by Edwin A. Abbott, Flatland, and its sequels and adaptations
  - Spaceland (novel), a 2002 science-fiction novel by Rudy Rucker, a sequel to Flatland
- Spaceland (comic book storyline) a comic storyline in the 2000AD comics illustrated by Edmund Bagwell
- Spaceland (videogaming) a fictional location in Call of Duty: Infinite Warfare, see List of zombie video games

Other uses

- Spaceland (2016 album), an Icelandic album by Sin Fang

== See also ==
- Extraterrestrial real estate, land in outer space
- Land (disambiguation)
- Space (disambiguation)
