= Spacetime Donuts =

1981 novel by Rudy Rucker

First edition (publ. Ace Books)

Spacetime Donuts is a novel by Rudy Rucker published in 1981.

== Plot summary ==
Spacetime Donuts is a novel in which the universe consists of a single particle which is folded over and over to create everything that exists.

== Reception ==
Greg Costikyan reviewed Spacetime Donuts in Ares Magazine #12 and commented that "Not up to the caliber of Rucker's previous White Light."

== Reviews ==
- Review by Barry N. Malzberg (1982) in The Magazine of Fantasy & Science Fiction, June 1982
- Review by Tom Easton (1982) in Analog Science Fiction/Science Fact, June 1982
- Review by Thomas M. Disch (1982) in Rod Serling's The Twilight Zone Magazine, June 1982

== See also ==
- One-electron universe
