= The Hacker and the Ants =

1994 novel by Rudy Rucker

- First edition
- Author: Rudy Rucker
- Language: English
- Genre: Science fiction
- Publisher: AvoNova
- Publication date: May 1994 (Morrow/AvoNova); May 1995 (AvoNova)
- Publication place: United States
- Media type: Print (Hardcover; softcover)
- Pages: 307
- ISBN: 0-380-71844-8 (1994)
- OCLC: 32732575

The Hacker and the Ants is a science fiction novel by American writer and mathematician Rudy Rucker, published in 1994 by Avon Books. It was written while Rucker was working as a programmer at Autodesk, Inc., of Sausalito, California from 1988 to 1992.

== Plot summary ==
Jerzy Rugby is trying to create truly intelligent robots. While his actual life crumbles, Rugby toils in his virtual office, testing the robots online. Then, something goes wrong and zillions of computer virus ants invade the net. Rugby is the man wanted for the crime. He's been set up to take a fall for a giant cyberconspiracy and he needs to figure out who — or what — is sabotaging the system in order to clear his name. Plunging deep into the virtual worlds of Antland of Fnoor to find some answers, Rugby confronts both electronic and all-too-real perils, facing death itself in a battle for his freedom.

== Transrealism ==
The main character is a transrealist interpretation of Rucker's life in the 1970s. (Rucker taught mathematics at the State University College at Geneseo, New York from 1972 to 1978.) As such, though the character is fictional, he bears some exaggerated resemblance to Rucker's interpretation of himself at the time. Rucker tells John Shirley in the introduction to recent editions, "I have never really left my body and gone to infinity's Heaven."
