= The Hacker's Diet =

Diet plan by John Walker

The Hacker's Diet (humorously subtitled "How to lose weight and hair through stress and poor nutrition") is a diet plan created by the founder of Autodesk, John Walker, outlined in an electronic book of the same name, that attempts to aid the process of weight loss by more accurately modeling how calories consumed and calories expended actually impact weight. Originally written in 1991, Walker notes that much of our fat free mass introduces signal noise when trying to determine how much weight we're actually losing or gaining. With the help of a graphing tool (Excel is used in the book), he addresses these problems. Factoring in exercise, and through counting calories, one can calculate one's own total energy expenditure (basal metabolic rate, thermic effect of food, and day-to-day exercise) and cut back calorie intake or increase exercise to lose weight.

== Dieting as an engineering problem ==
Walker describes the diet as approaching weight loss "as an engineering problem", claiming that his approach enabled him to reduce his weight from 98 kg to 66 kg in a year and keep it stable afterwards.

Walker considers the problem of weight loss and maintenance as a control system problem. Simplifying the problem to the barest elements, he models the human body as a "rubber bag," where variables such as food type, frequency, metabolic rates and even exercise are considered negligible. According to Walker, the difference between calorie intake and expenditure is the key (a calorie surplus leads to weight gain; a calorie deficit leads to weight loss). To solve the problem, one needs to monitor calorie intake and weight loss rate and make the desired proportional adjustments to reach the desired goal.

== The body as a system ==
Walker also introduces the reader at some length to simple feedback and control systems, providing spreadsheets to demonstrate feedback, oscillation and data smoothing to illustrate his arguments. While the diet is a fairly straightforward calorie-counting approach, data smoothing (exponential moving averages in particular) is considered a key element of the monitoring system. Walker presents techniques for Excel-aided or paper-and-pencil data smoothing to allow the dieter to adjust the diet for themselves using the long-term trend and to not be discouraged by short-term fluctuations based on water retention or other factors.

The diet also uses the trend line as a control system to allow the dieter early warning of relapse after the target weight is reached. As Walker states, "The vast majority of people who lose weight end up, in relatively short order, gaining back every pound they lost." A quick check of the trend line provides an easy way to make small adjustments in intake, allowing much greater control of weight for life.

== Tools ==
Walker uses Excel spreadsheets to log weight and produce charts but provides a list of other software packages that may be used. Walker also provides a free online tracker and grapher at his Fourmilab website, and the program Eat Watch, mobile tracking and charting services for the Palm platform.

== See also ==
- List of diets
