= The Fourth Dimension (book) =

1984 book by Rudy Rucker

The Fourth Dimension: Toward a Geometry of Higher Reality
- First edition
- Author: Rudy Rucker
- Language: English
- Subject: Mathematics
- Genre: Popular mathematics
- Publisher: Houghton Mifflin Harcourt
- Publication date: September 1, 1984
- Publication place: United States
- Media type: Print
- Pages: 228
- ISBN: 978-0395344200

The Fourth Dimension: Toward a Geometry of Higher Reality (1984) is a popular mathematics book by Rudy Rucker, an American professor of mathematics and computer science. It provides a popular presentation of set theory and four dimensional geometry as well as some mystical implications. A foreword is provided by Martin Gardner, and the 200+ illustrations are by David Povilaitis.

The Fourth Dimension: Toward a Geometry of Higher Reality was reprinted in 1985 as the paperback The Fourth Dimension: A Guided Tour of the Higher Universes. It was again reprinted in paperback in 2014 by Dover Publications with its original subtitle.

Like some of Rucker's other books, The Fourth Dimension is dedicated to Edwin Abbott Abbott, author of the novella Flatland.

== Synopsis ==
The Fourth Dimension teaches readers about the concept of a fourth spatial dimension. Several analogies are made to Flatland; in particular, Rucker compares how a square in Flatland would react to a cube in Spaceland to how a cube in Spaceland would react to a hypercube from the fourth dimension.

The book also includes multiple puzzles.

== Reception ==
Kirkus Reviews called it "animated, often amusing", and a "rare treat", but noted that the book eventually leaves mathematical topics behind to focus instead on "mysticism of the all-is-one-one-is-all thinking of an Ouspensky." The Quarterly Review of Biology declared it to be "nice", and "at times (...) enchanting", comparing it to The Tao of Physics.

== See also ==
- Hiding in the Mirror, a similar book by Lawrence M. Krauss.
