= Wetware (novel) =

1988 novel by Rudy Rucker

- Cover of first edition (paperback)
- Author: Rudy Rucker
- Cover artist: Joe Devito
- Language: English
- Series: Ware Tetralogy
- Genre: Science fiction novel
- Publisher: Avon Books (U.S.)
- Publication date: 1988
- Publication place: United States
- Media type: Print (paperback)
- Pages: 183 pp
- ISBN: 0-380-70178-2 (third edition, paperback)
- OCLC: 17936146
- LC Class: CPB Box no. 1746 vol. 9
- Preceded by: Software
- Followed by: Freeware

Wetware is a 1988 biopunk science fiction novel written by Rudy Rucker. It shared the Philip K. Dick Award in 1989 with Four Hundred Billion Stars by Paul J. McAuley. The novel is the second book in Rucker's Ware Tetralogy, preceded by Software in 1982 and followed by Freeware in 1997.

== Plot summary ==
Set in 2030–2031, ten years after the events of Software, Wetware focuses on the attempt of an Edgar Allan Poe-obsessed bopper named Berenice to populate Earth with a robot/human hybrid called a meatbop. Toward this end, she implants an embryo in a human woman living on the Moon (Della Taze, Cobb Anderson's niece) and then frames her for murder to force her to return to Earth. After only a few days, she gives birth to a boy named Manchile, who has been genetically programmed to carry bopper software in his brain (and in his sperm), and to grow to maturity in a matter of weeks.

Berenice's plan is for Manchile to announce the formation of a new religion unifying boppers and humans, and then arrange to have himself assassinated. (Rucker makes several allusions to the Christ story; Taze's abbreviated pregnancy is discovered on Christmas Eve, for instance.) Before the assassination, Manchile impregnates several women, the idea being that his similarly accelerated offspring will create a race of meatbops at an exponential rate.

The plot goes disastrously awry, and a human corporation called ISDN retaliates against the boppers by infecting them with a genetically modified organism called chipmold. The artificial disease succeeds in killing off the boppers, but when it infects the boppers' outer coating, a kind of smart plastic known as flickercladding, it creates a new race of intelligent symbiotes known as moldies — thus fulfilling Berenice's dream of an organic/synthetic hybrid.

Both of the two main human characters of Software play prominent roles in Wetware: Cobb Anderson, whose robot body was destroyed at the end of the last novel, has his software implanted in a new body so he can help raise Manchile; while Sta-Hi Mooney—now known as Stahn Mooney—is now working as a private detective on the Moon after accidentally killing his wife, and is used as a pawn in various bopper and anti-bopper schemes.

The Belle of Louisville, a steamboat of historic significance located in Louisville, Kentucky (the setting for the earthbound portions of the book), occurs as a character in the book, in which it is revealed that the steamer has been imbued with an onboard artificial intelligence.
