= Master of Space and Time =

1984 novel by Rudy Rucker

- First edition (publ. Bluejay Books); Cover artist: Ron Walotsky
- Author: Rudy Rucker
- Language: English
- Publisher: Bluejay Books
- Publication date: 1984
- Dewey Decimal: 813.54
- LC Class: PS3568.U298 M37

Master of Space and Time is a 1984 science fiction novel by American writer Rudy Rucker that centers on an inventor, Harry Gerber, who discovers a way to create his own tailor-made universe.

Daniel Clowes and director Michel Gondry discussed making a film based on the novel, with Clowes writing and Gondry directing, but Clowes has since said, "I actually announced that that wasn't going to be made at the 2006 San Diego [Comic] Con."

The SF Site described the novel as a cross between The Fabulous Furry Freak Brothers, Kurt Vonnegut, Frank Zappa, and the Marx Brothers, calling it "hilarious" and "a glorious joyride through space and time and weird science".

== See also ==
- Leon Russell: one of his titles and signature nicknames: Master of Space and Time
