= Sergio Badilla Castillo =

Chilean poet (born 1947)

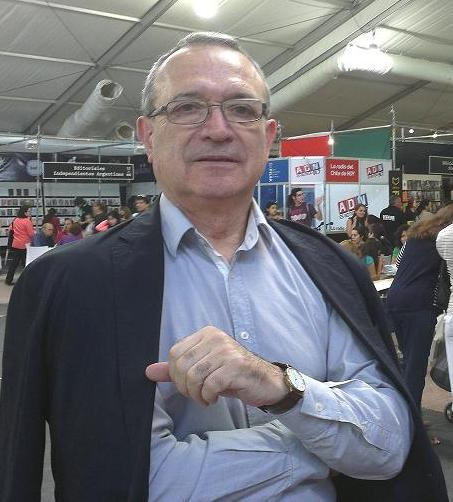
- Castillo in 2013
- Born: November 30, 1947 (age 78) Valparaíso, Chile
- Occupation: Poet, journalist
- Language: Spanish (Chilean)

Sergio Badilla Castillo (born November 30, 1947) is a Chilean poet who is the founder of poetic transrealism in contemporary poetry. He is considered the Latin American poet with the broadest Nordic influence, from the Finnish poets, Edith Södergran, Elmer Diktonius, Paavo Haavikko, Pentti Saarikoski and the Swedes Gunnar Ekelöf, Tomas Tranströmer and Lars Gustafsson.

== Life ==
Born on November 30, 1947, in Valparaíso, Castillo graduated in journalism from the University of Chile in 1972. He graduated also in Methodology of Social Anthropology, from Stockholm University. He worked for nearly 13 years at The Swedish Radio Broadcasting Co, as culture journalist, a concern that would lead later, to his work as a translator of Swedish and Scandinavian poetry, British and American poetry.

His father was a sailor from whom he got his nomadic motivation. Badilla Castillo travelled throughout Europe, North Africa and the Middle East during the 20 years he spent in Scandinavia. He settled for a while also in Romania in 1975, interested in ancient Wallachian and Transylvanian mythology. Badilla worked as a journalist and teacher when he returned to Chile in 1993.

A research on global celebrities done by the Massachusetts Institute of Technology, MIT, through its Pantheon project, released in April 2014, shows that the poet Sergio Badilla Castillo occupies 12th position among the most notorious public figures of Chile in the world community. The investigation took into account 11,338 people born between 4000 BC until 2010 D.C. Castillo also appears in the fourth positions amid the most famous Chilean writers of all times.

== Work ==
In 1973, Badilla's first book of poetry, Amid the Cement and the Grass, was published in Valparaiso. Later, in 1980 he published his second book, Lower from my Branch, a collection of short stories, in Borås, Sweden, which received very good critical reviews.

Between 1981 and 1987, he published three of his Scandinavian influenced books: The Dwelling of the Sign, Oniric Song and Reverberations of Aquatic Stones. As well being a productive poet during this period he was also a respected translator of Swedish, Finnish, English, French and some Latin poetry. Badilla's initial topics were often tied to mythological or fabled subjects, while many of the poems featured legends. In Sweden, his poems were included in the first anthology of Chilean Poetry published by Bonnier in 1991.

His return from exile to Chile in 1993 marked a change for Badilla Castillo, in that he started to write in a much more autobiographical and manner. In his book Nordic Saga he changed his language completely. It was a period of awkward and challenging experimentation, with many legendary subjects derived from the mythological Viking's Sagas. Badilla Castillo established contact with Rudy Rucker's transrealism.

In Badilla Castillo's later volumes, such as The Fearful Gaze of the Bastard (2003), and Transreal Poems and Some Gospels (2005)), he confronts reality, creating an almost illusory world, where words, time and dimensional changes play a cardinal role in the lyrical frame. His latest poetry is solidly imaginary, using in many respects time dislocations and immediate perceptions of a certain described reality, and filled with admiration for the ordinary world. He now lives in Santiago, and one catches a glimpse of the effect of this South Pacific landscape everywhere in his latest poems, though the environment remains symbolic and individual.

== Bibliography ==
- Lower from my Branch Invandrarförlaget. 1980. Borås. Sweden. (Short stories)
- Sign’s Dwelling. Bikupa Editions. 1982. Stockholm. (Poetry)
- Cantoniric. LAR Editions. 1983. Madrid. (Poetry)
- Reverberations Of Aquatic Stones. Bikupa. 1985. Stockholm. (Poetry)
- Terrenalis. Bikupa Editions. 1989. Stockholm. (Poetry)
- Nordic Saga. Monteverdi Editions. 1996, Santiago de Chile. (Poetry)
- The Fearful Gaze of the Bastard. 2003. Regional Council of Valparaiso. (Poetry)
- Transrealistic Poems and Some Gospels. 2005. Aura Latina. Santiago/Stockholm. (Poetry)
- Transreal City Meridian Editors. 2009 Smederevo. Serbia. (bilingüal edition) (Poetry)
- Ville Asiégée Al Manar. Voix Vives de Méditerraée. July 2010. France (bilingüal edition)(Poetry)
- "Ok Atacama". Pentagrama ediciones. Julio 2010, Santiago de Chile (Poetry)
- "The Medusa's head". Coldhub press. Christchurch. 2012. New Zealand (bilingüal edition) (Poetry)
- "La Biblioteca de Éfeso". Poemas Selectos. Strindberg&Co. 2012. Stockholm/Santiago de Chile.(Poetry)
- "Ghosts & shadows". Coldhub press. Christchurch. 2013. New Zealand (bilingüal edition) (Poetry)
- "Transtierra".. Aura Latina. 2013. Santiago de Chile. (Poetry)
