= Postsingular =

2007 novel by Rudy Rucker

- Author: Rudy Rucker
- Cover artist: Georgette Douwma
- Language: English
- Genre: Science fiction novel
- Publisher: TOR
- Publication date: October 2, 2007 (1st edition)/ February 3, 2009 (1st reprint)
- Publication place: United States
- Media type: Print (hardback & paperback) and e-book
- Pages: 320 pp (print) / 179 pp (e-book)
- ISBN: 0-7653-1741-9 (hardcover), ISBN 0-7653-1872-5 (paperback)
- OCLC: 129957591
- Dewey Decimal: 813/.54—dc22
- LC Class: PS3568.U298 P67 2007

Postsingular is a 2007 science-fiction novel written by the American writer Rudy Rucker. It focuses upon a cast of San Franciscans and their relationship with emerging uses of nanotechnology. It was the first of Rucker's works to be licensed under a Creative Commons license and released to the public on the Internet.

A sequel, Hylozoic, was released in 2009, but was not released under a free license.

== Summary ==
The novel is divided into four parts. Most of the events in the story take place in a future version of San Francisco.

=== Part 1 ===
The first part begins on a New Year's Day, in which a young, 17-year-old Jeff Luty and his friend Carlos Tucay are about to light bottle rockets on Stinson Beach. The two boys, who are interested in the young but growing nanotechnology industry, dream about establishing Lu-Tuc Space Tech, and have inserted nanorobots into the rockets. After a passing dog had urinated on the rocket, the rockets are lit again. However, the rocket eventually misfires, and a launch lug is sent flying into Carlos' right eye, killing him.

The first part fast forwards several years later, in which Jeff is the CEO of Nantel, the leading nanotechnology company in the world. One of the leading employees of the company is engineer Ond Lutter, who works on a project to create "nants". However, when Jeff, who is still distraught over Carlos' death, comes to blows with Ond over the creation of a virtual earth with the nants. The US government buys the nants, and the president, Dick Dibbs, announces that the Earth will be eaten by the nants and converted into a virtual version of the Earth, or "vEarth". Ond and his family, however, do not agree. Ond, who is fired after arguing with Luty and defying him, sets about to write code on paper by hand which should disable the nants and builds an antenna to resist the advance of the nants until the house is the last of the holdouts to persist on physical Earth. Ond's 9-year-old son Chu, however, is an autistic savant and is able to retain Ond's written code to memory and jumps into the wall of nants that has grown in the Lutter house. Chu subsequently jumps back out of the nant wall and the nants begin to retreat. By the next day, the nants have mostly reversed all their advances across Earth and restores it in its entirety until they return to the Moon and are seemingly shot out of existence by a Chinese satellite.

After the reversal and destruction of the nants, Dibbs is arrested by the government and executed for his role in the "vEarth" conspiracy (classified as "treason"). Luty is now a wanted fugitive and goes into hiding; Ond, who is rehired by Nantel, now renamed as ExaExa Labs, however, is inspired by nanorobotics to create a new type of nanorobot, which becomes known as the "orphids". When he tells a gathering of his and fellow co-worker Craigor Lundquist's families in San Francisco Bay, however, Nektar becomes angry against Ond and argues against Ond over the nants, for fear of a repeat of the events. Chu, irritated by the shouting, seizes the jar and smashes the glass open, releasing the orphids to rapidly self-replicate. Within hours, the orphids, which are heavily connected to the Internet, spread to most of the West Coast, and Ond is wanted by the San Francisco Police Department. The orphids also provide displays for augmented reality, ridding society of the need for AR contact lenses (or "webeyes"), throat microphones and other AR utilities.

The city has a hard time adapting to the orphids and the sensorally immersive version of the Internet, or "orphidnet", presented by the orphids. The advanced properties of the orphidnet allow for opportunities not possible with prior computing technologies, such as advanced teleconferencing, telepathy and even remote sex between physically separated partners. However, this leaves little room for privacy, as the orphids barely allow for any living thing to be non-connected to the orphidnet, meaning that Ond is the subject of a mob which seeks to lynch him for "Orphid Night".

Nektar, irritated by Ond's release of the nants, separates from Ond and becomes intimate with a cook at a nearby restaurant who she met through the orphidnet, leaving Ond to take care of Chu; furthermore, Ond and Chu discover the existence of a higher-intelligence dimension which somewhat mirrors earth. One of the rulers of the so-called "Hibrane" version of San Francisco, Gladax, tries to remove the means of "Lobrane" access to the Hibrane in order to keep Lobraners out, going so far as to penetrate Chu's mind. The pursuit of Ond and Chu by both Gladax and the anti-nant/orphid mob ultimately send the two teleporting from the Merz Boat to the Hibrane version of San Francisco, where everything is slower and larger.

=== Part 2 ===
Years later, San Francisco has become reliant upon the orphidnet, and the story focuses upon a group of teenage residents, known as "kiqqies", who are homeless but depend upon dumpster-diving and a particular portion of the orphidnet known as "the Big Pig". The Pig is seen as an addiction to those whose minds are clear, as it allows for its partakers to rapidly glean information for so long as one is accessing it.

Jayjay, Thuy, Sonic and Kitty eventually meet Nektar, who has become head chef at a popular restaurant and the lead personality of a reality series, Founders, which is broadcast to viewers over the orphidnet. Nektar was being psychologically tortured and blackmailed by orphidnet "beetles" for criticizing presidential candidate Dick Too Dibbs (and refusing to run Dibbs' ads), the cousin of the disgraced former president, and the four visit her home to clear the beetles. After eating with the other cast members - Craigor and Jil - and leaving Nektar's home, the kiqqies happen upon the body of a former high-scoring quantum gamer who became addicted to the Big Pig and starved to death, motivating the kiqqies to visit the Natural Mind center to calm their minds away from the Big Pig.

The four visit the Natural Mind offices in the San Francisco Armory and are invited to visit the office of the center's director, Andrew Topping, who offers to hire Sonic and Thuy for their skills (Sonic is a quantum gamer, and Thuy writes "metanovels"). When the four suspect Topping's relationship with Jeff Luty and reject the offer, Topping seizes Thuy and attempts to throw her into the grating. The four fight Topping, and when Sonic wrestles Topping for Topping's gun, JayJay rushes Topping, pushing Topping and (accidentally) Sonic bloodlessly through the grating. The remaining three - Thuy, JayJay and Kittie, run from the Natural Mind building.

=== Part 3 ===
Two months after the Natural Mind incident, Thuy is recovering from her addiction to the Big Pig and focuses more on developing her semi-autobiographical metanovel, Wheenk. When she begins to present a portion of her metanovel for a small audience, the event is disrupted by an attack shoon. Thuy runs out across the street and is rescued by JayJay, who demonstrates his recent mastering of teleportation through the orphidnet to bring them to the Merz Boat of Jil and Craigor. Due to Craigor's chronic infidelity, Jil has become addicted to sudocoke and has an erratic behavior. When the boat is attacked by attack shoons which are suspected of originating from Jeff Luty, the four defend the boat, only to find out from one of the shoons how Sonic had been blackmailed by Luty to create attack shoons for Luty's use against his enemies, including Thuy. Teleporting from the boat, JayJay and Thuy stop at Nektar's house before being chased by another attack shoon.

The two teleport to Easter Island, where they rest, gather weapons and gain information from Azaroth and other Hibraners. The two also find out about a massacre organized by Luty at his ExaExa compound to stall law enforcement, his plan to re-release the nants into the world for a Vearth 2.0, and the Big Pig's intentions toward the nants. The two teleport back to the Merz Boat to pick up Craigor and Jil, but not before curing Jil of nanomachines which were laced inside the sudocoke that she snorted up. The four teleport to the ExaExa compound in the middle of a gunfight, fighting armed guards and rescuing Sonic before Sonic, Thuy and Jil are captured by Luty's agents, including Topping. Luty asserts his plans to release the nants from his "ark" but unsuccessfully demands that Thuy contact Ond, who is still in the Hibrane. Before Topping makes good on Luty's threat to kill Sonic before her eyes, Gladax appears and kills the agents. Sonic runs through the nearby grating and blows up much of the machinery with a grenade, presumptively killing himself in the process. Luty escapes through what is left of the grating. Before they teleport from the compound, Jil breaks up with Craigor and ends their marriage.

Now with the ark in tow, Thuy and JayJay return to Easter Island to think of a way to destroy the nants. However, the Big Pig returns demanding that the ark be opened. After torture, JayJay agrees to open the box, only to find it booby-trapped with nant goo which consumes much of his body before Thuy's eyes. The pain of seeing the incident results in Thuy finishing her metanovel and finding the means to teleport on her own to the Hibrane. However, the Big Pig assures Thuy that not only is her boyfriend not dead, but that Thuy could save him and potentially stop the destruction of Earth by the nants if she returns to the Lobrane with Ond and Chu by midnight. Desperate, Thuy teleports to the Hibrane.

=== Part 4 ===
Thuy teleports, through a zone which has monsters known as "subbies", to the Hibrane's version of Easter Island. This dimension's world and its inhabitants, like Gladax and Azaroth, are gigantic and slow in movement compared to Lobrane inhabitants like Thuy. Gladax returns and tries to capture Thuy, but she escapes and, with Azaroth's remote help, teleports to Hibrane San Francisco. The two then run in disguise to Gladax's home, where Ond and Chu are imprisoned by Gladax in order to avert the potential nant invasion from the Lobrane to the Hibrane. Ond tells Thuy that if he can bring back to the Lobrane the ability of tagging infinite, semantic memory and telepathy to every object by unrolling the eighth dimension (embedded in a harp owned by Gladax), it would negate the need for nants to reconvert the Lobrane Earth to vEarth. The group set up a plan and proceed to action, in which Ond gives up Thuy to Gladax and the group teleports to Gladax's room where the harp is located. When Gladax leaves her in a net while stepping outside to berate her gardeners (with Azaroth distracting her), Thuy breaks free of the net, takes the harp and teleports with Ond and Chu. However, the group drops the harp in the waters of the Planck frontier (or "Subdee" in Hibraner lingo), and Thuy leaves the group to return to the Lobrane while she seeks to rescue the harp, only to end up captured by subbies.

Meanwhile, Jayjay remains on Earth in a coma, being used by the Big Pig to run an entire simulated lifetime of 60 years in his head in six hours. In the simulated reality, Jayjay waits for Thuy to return, but the nants are released by the Big Pig and convert the Earth into vEarth, in which Jayjay becomes a physicist and learns many of the same concepts which have been learned in real life by Ond and Chu. Going through two marriages, Jayjay experiences the pressures of life in Vearth and the limitations of dependence upon computational resources. Jayjay experiences his death at the simulated age of eighty-six, waiting for Thuy. Meanwhile, Thuy fights her way out of the grasp of subbies who plan to eat her, and their leader is a beetle-like subbie possessing the skin of Luty, who was eaten by the subbies when he fell into the Subdee. She escapes with the harp, and returns to Jayjay on Lobrane Easter Island, only for the Big Pig to open the ark of the nants. The two teleport to Nektar's house in San Francisco, where Jayjay tries to play the "Lost Chord" which will unroll the eighth dimension while the nants amass and threaten to eat the world again. Thuy and Jayjay go into a room to have sex, and Jayjay rediscovers the Lost Chord from his experience in the simulation, and he plays it, unrolling the eighth dimension and ending the nant invasion. The unrolling results in the creation of new beings called "silps" which copy the data and knowledge from both nants and orphids and then destroying both. The silps constitute themselves as a planetary oversoul known as Gaia, and the Big Pig redesigns herself as an interface for Gaia.

The main characters' lives change after the unrolling: Jil divorces Craigor and marries Ond, Nektar becomes romantically linked to Kittie, Chu manages to heal his autism, and Jayjay and Thuy become engaged.

== Characters ==
- Jeff Luty - the founder and CEO, an antagonist of the novel
- Ond Lutter - engineer at ExaExa Labs (formerly Nantel) who invents the nants and later the orphids
- Nektar Lundquist - wife of Ond and mother of Chu, leaves Ond due to disagreements over nants
- Jil Zonder - wife of Craigor and mother of Momotaro and Bixie, has an addiction to a synthetic version of cocaine known as sudocoke.
- Craigor Connor - a fisherman of cuttlefish who lives with his family on the Merz Boat
- Chu Lutter - son of Ond and Nektar, autistic and highly intelligent, is capable of decoding the mathematical formula for teleportation.
- Thuy Nguyen - young Vietnamese-American woman and girlfriend of JayJay who uses the orphids to help her write a "metanovel"
- Jorge "JayJay" Jimenez - boyfriend of Thuy
- Sonic Sanchez - friend of JayJay
- Kittie Calhoun - friend of JayJay
- Bixie Zonder - daughter of Jil and Craigor
- Momotaro Zonder - son of Jil and Craigor
- Dick Dibbs - president of the United States, is executed after having plotted the unsuccessful assimilation of Earth into vEarth by the nants
- Dick Too Dibbs - second cousin of Dick Dibbs, resident of Owensboro, Kentucky, member of the Homesteady Party
- Bernardo Lampton - president running for re-election against Dick Too Dibbs
- Azaroth - resident from the "Hibrane" version of San Francisco who visits the Lobrane version to take cuttlefish
- Gladax - resident from the "Hibrane" version of San Francisco who is the mother of Azaroth

== History ==
Portions of the book were previously published in Asimov's Science Fiction magazine and Year's Best SF 12 in 2006.

== Reception ==
The science fiction author and activist Cory Doctorow reviewed the book for Boing Boing, summarizing it as "pure Rucker: a dope-addled exploration of the way-out fringes of string theory and the quantum universe that distorts the possible into the most improbable contortions," and rated it as "one of the most fun, strangest, most thought-provoking sf novels I've read, and it's fantastic to have it show up on the net, ready to be copied and shared." He praised the decision to release the material under a Creative Commons license.

Booklist stated that "While Rucker’s improbable scenarios sometimes cross the line into pure silliness, his devoted fans and dazzled newcomers to him will revel in his willingness to push technological extrapolation to its soaring limits.". io9's Charlie Jane Anders stated that it "actually pulls off the ambitious multilayered story it sets out to tell," but described the novel as being full of "bizarre idea-spikes" such as the hibrane.

== See also ==
- Blood Music, novel by Greg Bear which depicts a grey goo scenario
- Self-replicating machines in fiction
- Claytronics
- Utility fog
- smartdust
