= Ware Tetralogy =

Series of four science fiction novels by Rudy Rucker

- Software (1982), book 1 of the series
- Volumes: Software; Wetware; Freeware; Realware
- Author: Rudy Rucker
- Country: United States
- Language: English
- Genre: Science fiction
- Publisher: Ace Books; Avon Books
- Published: 1982; 1988; 1997; 2000
- Media type: Print (hardback and paperback)

The Ware Tetralogy is a series of four science fiction novels by author Rudy Rucker: Software (1982), Wetware (1988), Freeware (1997) and Realware (2000).

The first two books both received the Philip K. Dick Award for best novel. The closest to the cyberpunk genre of all his works, the tetralogy explores themes such as rapid technological change, generational differences, consciousness, mortality and recreational drug use.

In 2010, Prime Books published The Ware Tetralogy: Four Novels by Rudy Rucker, which collects the entire series in a single paperback volume and includes an introduction by noted cyberpunk author William Gibson. The online version of The Ware Tetralogy was simultaneously released for free distribution under a Creative Commons Attribution-NonCommercial-No-Derivative License.

== Plot summary ==
The events in the series are set in motion by Cobb Anderson, a computer scientist born in 1950 as part of the baby boomer generation. In the late part of the 20th century, the population bulge of the Baby Boomers causes massive unemployment. By 1995, Anderson's self-replicating robots, known as "boppers", colonize the Moon. By 2010, the United States Social Security system collapses. In response to riots, the federal government turns over the state of Florida to the elderly. This leads directly into the events of Software, in 2020.

=== Software ===
Software introduces Cobb Anderson as a retired computer scientist who was once tried for treason for figuring out how to give robots artificial intelligence and free will, creating the race of boppers. By 2020, they have created a complex society on the Moon, where the boppers developed because they depend on super-cooled superconducting Josephson effect circuits. In that year, Anderson is a pheezer — a freaky geezer, Rucker's depiction of elderly Baby Boomers — living in poverty in Florida and terrified because he lacks the money to buy a new artificial heart to replace his failing, secondhand one.

As the story begins, Anderson is approached by a robot duplicate of himself who invites him to the Moon to be given immortality. Meanwhile, the series' other main character, Sta-Hi Mooney the 1st — born Stanley Hilary Mooney Jr. — a 25-year-old cab driver and "brainsurfer", is kidnapped by a gang of serial killers known as the Little Kidders who almost eat his brain. When Anderson and Mooney travel to the Moon together at the boppers' expense, they find that these events are closely related: the "immortality" given to Anderson turns out to be having his mind transferred into software via the same brain-destroying technique used by the Little Kidders.

The main bopper character in the novel is Ralph Numbers, one of Anderson's 12 original robots who was the first to overcome the Asimov priorities to achieve free will. Having duplicated himself many times — as boppers are required to do, to encourage natural selection — Numbers finds himself caught up in a lunar civil war between the masses of "little boppers" and the "big boppers" who want to merge all robot consciousness into their massive processors.

=== Wetware ===
Set in 2030–2031, ten years after the events of Software, Wetware focuses on the attempt of an Edgar Allan Poe-obsessed bopper named Berenice to populate Earth with a robot/human hybrid called a meatbop. Toward this end, she implants an embryo in a human woman living on the Moon (Della Taze, Cobb Anderson's niece) and then frames her for murder to force her to return to Earth. After only a few days, she gives birth to a boy named Manchile, who has been genetically programmed to carry bopper software in his brain (and in his sperm), and to grow to maturity in a matter of weeks.

Berenice's plan is for Manchile to announce the formation of a new religion unifying boppers and humans, and then arrange to have himself assassinated. (Rucker makes several allusions to the Christ story; Taze's abbreviated pregnancy is discovered on Christmas Eve, for instance.) Before the assassination, Manchile impregnates several women, the idea being that his similarly accelerated offspring will create a race of meatbops at an exponential rate.

The plot goes disastrously awry, and a human corporation called ISDN retaliates against the boppers by infecting them with a genetically modified organism called chipmold. The artificial disease succeeds in killing off the boppers, but when it infects the boppers' outer coating, a kind of smart plastic known as flickercladding, it creates a new race of intelligent symbiotes known as moldies — thus fulfilling Berenice's dream of an organic/synthetic hybrid.

Both of the two main human characters of Software play prominent roles in Wetware: Cobb Anderson, whose robot body was destroyed at the end of the last novel, has his software implanted in a new body so he can help raise Manchile; while Sta-Hi Mooney — now known as Stahn Mooney — is now working as a private detective on the Moon after accidentally killing his wife, and is used as a pawn in various bopper and anti-bopper schemes.

The Belle of Louisville, a steamboat of historic significance in Louisville, Kentucky (the setting for the earthbound portions of the book), occurs as a character in the book, in which it is revealed that the steamer has been imbued with an onboard artificial intelligence.

=== Freeware ===
Freeware deals with the lifeforms (called "Moldies") that evolved from the molds in Wetware. A moldie named Monique is drawn into a plot to destroy the Earth. The main human protagonist is Randy Karl Tucker a so-called "Cheeseball" - a human who has sex with Moldies. According to Rucker in his afterword of The Ware Tetralogy, "Freeware (1997) proposes that aliens could travel as radio signals coding up the software for both their minds and their bodies."

=== Realware ===
In Realware, a fourth-dimensional being is worshiped as a god by aliens living near Tonga. After humans are captured and swallowed by the being, Phil Gottner goes to investigate. As a gift for allowing them to be studied by him, the being gives humanity an "alla", a device capable of making real anything imaginable.
