= Semiotext(e) SF =

First edition (publ. Autonomedia) Cover art by Mike Saenz

Semiotext(e) SF is a science fiction anthology released in 1989 and edited by Rudy Rucker, Peter Lamborn Wilson and Robert Anton Wilson. It includes short stories and other works by J. G. Ballard, William S. Burroughs, Kerry Thornley, William Gibson, Bruce Sterling, and others.

- USA ISBN 0-936756-43-8
- UK ISBN 1-873176-81-3
