= Software (novel) =

1982 novel by Rudy Rucker

- Cover of first edition (paperback)
- Author: Rudy Rucker
- Language: English
- Series: Ware Tetralogy
- Genre: Science fiction novel
- Publisher: Ace Books (USA)
- Publication date: January 1982
- Publication place: United States
- Media type: Print (Paperback)
- Pages: 167 pp
- ISBN: 0-441-77408-3 (first edition, paperback)
- LC Class: CPB Box no. 2484 vol. 16
- Followed by: Wetware

Software is a 1982 cyberpunk science fiction novel written by Rudy Rucker. It won the first Philip K. Dick Award in 1983. The novel is the first book in Rucker's Ware Tetralogy, and was followed by a sequel, Wetware, in 1988.

== Plot summary ==
Software introduces Cobb Anderson as a retired computer scientist who was once tried for treason for figuring out how to give robots artificial intelligence and free will, creating the race of boppers. By 2020, they have created a complex society on the Moon, where the boppers developed because they depend on super-cooled superconducting circuits. In that year, Anderson is a pheezer—a freaky geezer, Rucker's depiction of elderly Baby Boomers—living in poverty in Florida and terrified because he lacks the money to buy a new artificial heart to replace his failing, secondhand one.

As the story begins, Anderson is approached by a robot duplicate of himself who invites him to the Moon to be given immortality. Meanwhile, the series' other main character, Sta-Hi Mooney the 1st—born Stanley Hilary Mooney Jr.—a 25-year-old cab driver and "brainsurfer", is kidnapped by a gang of serial killers known as the Little Kidders who almost eat his brain. When Anderson and Mooney travel to the Moon together at the boppers' expense, they find that these events are closely related: the "immortality" given to Anderson turns out to be having his mind transferred into software via the same brain-destroying technique used by the Little Kidders.

The main bopper character in the novel is Ralph Numbers, one of Anderson's 12 original robots who was the first to overcome the Asimov priorities to achieve free will. Having duplicated himself many times—as boppers are required to do, to encourage natural selection—Numbers finds himself caught up in a lunar civil war between the masses of "little boppers" and the "big boppers" who want to merge all robot consciousness into their massive processors.

== Reception ==
Dave Langford reviewed Software for White Dwarf #72, and stated that "Rucker is picking at problems of personal identity. Lose your body and reinstall your software in a robot frame (complete with SEX and DRUNKENNESS: subroutines), and are you still you?"

== Reviews ==
- Review by Steve Carper (1982) in Science Fiction & Fantasy Book Review, #3, April 1982
- Review by Ralph E. Vaughan (1982) in Science Fiction Review, Summer 1982
- Review by Thomas M. Disch (1982) in Rod Serling's The Twilight Zone Magazine, July 1982
- Review by Thomas A. Easton [as by Tom Easton] (1982) in Analog Science Fiction/Science Fact, September 1982
- Review by Nigel Richardson (1982) in Vector 111
- Review by Pascal J. Thomas [as by Pascal Thomas] (1983) in Paperback Inferno, Volume 7, Number 3
- Review by Terry Broome (1985) in Vector 129
- Review by Simon Ounsley (1985) in Interzone, #14 Winter 1985/86
- Review by Tom A. Jones (1986) in Paperback Inferno, #58
- Review [French] by Jean-Pierre Andrevon (1987) in Fiction, #386
- Review by John Newsinger (1988) in Paperback Inferno, #71
- Review by Steve Palmer (1994) in Vector 181
