= Spaceland (novel) =

2002 science fiction novel by Rudy Rucker

- Author: Rudy Rucker
- Language: English
- Genre: science fiction novel
- Published: 2002
- Publisher: Tor Books
- Publication place: United States
- Pages: 304
- ISBN: 0-7653-0367-1

Spaceland is a science fiction novel by American mathematician and computer scientist Rudy Rucker, and published in 2002 by Tor Books.

In a tribute to Edwin Abbott's Flatland, a classic mathematical fantasy about a 2-dimensional being (A. Square) who receives a surprise visit from a higher-dimensional sphere, Rudy Rucker's Spaceland describes the life of Joe Cube, an average, modern-day Silicon Valley hotshot who one day discovers the fourth dimension from an unexpected visitation.

== Plot summary ==
Joe Cube is a high tech executive waiting for his company's IPO. On the New Year's Eve before the new millennium, trying to impress his wife Jena, he brings home a prototype of his company's new product (a TV screen that turns standard television broadcasting into a 3D image). It brings no warmth to their cooling marriage, but it does attract the attention of somebody else. Joe is suddenly contacted by a Momo, a woman from the fourth dimension she calls the All, of which our entire world (which she calls Spaceland) is like nothing but the thin surface of a rug.

Momo has a business proposition for Joe that she will not let him refuse. She is bent on making him start a company that will create a specific product that she will supply. The upside potential becomes much clearer for Joe once Momo "augments" him, by helping him grow a new eye on a 4D stalk, giving him the power to see in four-dimensional directions, as well as the ability to see into our dimension using a four-dimension perspective.

== Reception ==
Strange Horizons felt that Joe's adventures were "thought-provoking", and compared the book positively to Ian Stewart's Flatterland, but faulted it for lacking in mathematical rigor. The A.V. Club considered it "fun yet thoughtful" and "unusually sedate", but criticized Rucker for his characterization. Publishers Weekly called it "a hilarious tribute (to Flatland); Kirkus Reviews, however, found it to be "not funny, not fascinating" and "for fans only", and the Notices of the American Mathematical Society—while conceding that it "is a fun read"—emphasized its shortcomings, including that Rucker is too repetitive and didactic, and that the characters are "one-dimensional (pardon the pun)".
