= Poetic transrealism =

Transrealism in poetry or uchronism, according to this poetic movement's father, the Chilean poet Sergio Badilla Castillo, is created upon a transposition of time, which means that temporary scenes merge, in the textual corpus, and in this way linear coherence between the past, the present and the future is interrupted and reality turns into a kind of derivation or timeless link to a beyond-time, where poetic pictures and actions are represented or performed. This is how the temporal idea acquires a parachronic character or parachrony.

Another element of this transience is uchrony starting from a point in the past where something happened, in a different way or as it has happened, in reality (what could have been but wasn't), in material temporality, but nevertheless is possible to express itself as an element situated in abstract space, supported by the theories of Albert Einstein and Max Planck, regarding the spacetime combination.

As to a quantum, Badilla Castillo claims that poetic transrealism considers the concrete world of apparent experience to be dissolved between transformational mixture and subatomic conversions constantly confronted by matter. Chaos is in the heart of matter, it is the substantial and fortuitous element of the transformations of the cosmos before our singular and meager daily perception.

The greatest certainty we have as creative and poetic beings, according to transrealism, is that the universe imposes its major changes in the perceptive and imaginary capacity of the human brain, which this assumes as reality, subjective and full of symbolisms and delusions. Another major characteristic of Badilla's transrealism is an assembly between reality and myth, where there is no difference between certainty and uncertainty. For him, evidence is an act of chamanism, determined by the circumstances and alteration of a spacetime balance.
