= Infinity and the Mind =

Popular mathematics book

- First edition cover
- Author: Rudy Rucker
- Language: English
- Subject: Infinity, set theory
- Genre: Popular mathematics
- Publisher: Birkhäuser
- Publication date: 1 May 1982
- Publication place: United States
- Media type: Print
- Pages: 342
- ISBN: 978-3-7643-3034-7
- OCLC: 8113006

Infinity and the Mind: The Science and Philosophy of the Infinite is a popular mathematics book by American mathematician, computer scientist, and science fiction writer Rudy Rucker.

== Synopsis ==
The book contains accessible popular expositions on the mathematical theory of infinity, and a number of related topics. These include Gödel's incompleteness theorems and their relationship to concepts of artificial intelligence and the human mind, as well as the conceivability of some unconventional cosmological models. The material is approached from a variety of viewpoints, some more conventionally mathematical and others being nearly mystical. There is a brief account of the author's personal contact with Kurt Gödel.

An appendix contains a popular exposition on large cardinals in set theory.

== Reception ==
Dave Langford reviewed Infinity and the Mind for White Dwarf #41, and stated that "a must for anyone who enjoyed Hofstadter's Godel, Escher, Bach or the works of Martin Gardner."

Infinity and the Mind was reviewed by the New Yorker, which asserted that "Rudy Rucker's Infinity and the Mind is a terrific study with real mathematical depth." Martin Gardner described the book as "Informal, amusing, witty, profound... In an extraordinary burst of creative energy, Rudy Rucker has managed to bring together every aspect of mathematical infinity.... A dizzying glimpse into that boundless region of blinding light where the mysteries of transcendence shatter the clarity of logic, set theory, proof theory, and contemporary physics."

== Contents ==
- Chapter one: Infinity
- Chapter two: All the Numbers
- Chapter three: The Unnameable
- Chapter four: Robots and Souls
- Chapter five: The One and the Many
- Excursion I: The Transfinite Cardinals
- Excursion II: Gödel's Incompleteness Theorems
