= Rudy Rucker =

American mathematician and novelist (born 1946)

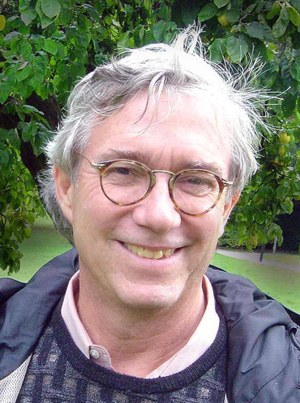
- Rucker in 2004
- Born: Rudolf von Bitter Rucker; March 22, 1946 (age 80); Louisville, Kentucky, U.S.
- Education: St. Xavier High School; Swarthmore College (BA); Rutgers University (MS, PhD)
- Occupation: Author
- Known for: Ware Tetralogy
- Spouse: Sylvia Rucker (m. 1967; died 2023)
- Relatives: G. W. F. Hegel (four generations removed)
- Website: Rudy Rucker

Rudolf von Bitter Rucker (/ˈrʌkər/; born March 22, 1946) is an American mathematician, computer scientist, science fiction author, and one of the founders of the cyberpunk literary movement. The author of both fiction and non-fiction, he is best known for the novels in the Ware Tetralogy, the first two of which (Software and Wetware) both won Philip K. Dick Awards. He edited the science fiction webzine Flurb until its closure in 2014.

== Early life ==
Rucker was born and raised in Louisville, Kentucky. He is the son of Embry Cobb Rucker Sr. (October 1, 1914 - August 1, 1994), who ran a small furniture-manufacture company and later became an Episcopal priest and community activist, and Marianne (née von Bitter). The Rucker family were of Huguenot descent. Through his mother, he is a great-great-great-grandson of Georg Wilhelm Friedrich Hegel.

Rucker attended St. Xavier High School before earning a BA in mathematics from Swarthmore College (1967) and MS (1969) and PhD (1973) degrees in mathematics from Rutgers University.

== Career ==
Rucker taught mathematics at the State University of New York at Geneseo from 1972 to 1978. Although he was liked by his students and "published a book [Geometry, Relativity and the Fourth Dimension] and several papers," several colleagues took umbrage at his long hair and convivial relationships with English and philosophy professors amid looming budget shortfalls; as a result, he failed to attain tenure in the "dysfunctional" department.

Thanks to a grant from the Alexander von Humboldt Foundation, Rucker taught at the Ruprecht Karl University of Heidelberg from 1978 to 1980. He then taught at Randolph-Macon Women's College in Lynchburg, Virginia from 1980 to 1982, before trying his hand as a full-time author for four years.

Inspired by an interview with Stephen Wolfram, Rucker became a computer science professor at San José State University in 1986, from which he retired as professor emeritus in 2004.

From 1988 to 1992 he was hired by John Walker of Autodesk as a programmer of cellular automata, which inspired his book The Hacker and the Ants.

A mathematician with philosophical interests, he has written The Fourth Dimension and Infinity and the Mind. Dover Publications republished The Fourth Dimension with a new preface in 2014. Princeton University Press published new editions of Infinity and the Mind, which was originally published in 1982, in 1995, 2005, and 2019, each with a new preface.

As his "own alternative to cyberpunk," Rucker developed a writing style he terms transrealism. Transrealism, as outlined in his 1983 essay The Transrealist Manifesto, is science fiction based on the author's own life and immediate perceptions, mixed with fantastic elements that symbolize psychological change. Many of Rucker's novels and short stories apply these ideas. One example of Rucker's transreal works is Saucer Wisdom, a novel in which the main character is abducted by aliens. Rucker and Tor, his publisher, marketed the book, tongue in cheek, as non-fiction.

His earliest transreal novel, White Light, was written during his time at Heidelberg. This transreal novel is based on his experiences at SUNY Geneseo.

Rucker often uses his novels to explore scientific or mathematical ideas; White Light examines the concept of infinity, while the Ware Tetralogy (written from 1982 through 2000) is in part an explanation of the use of natural selection to develop software (a subject also developed in his The Hacker and the Ants, written in 1994). His novels also put forward a mystical philosophy that Rucker has summarized in an essay titled, with only a bit of irony, "The Central Teachings of Mysticism" (included in Seek!, 1999).

His non-fiction book, The Lifebox, the Seashell, and the Soul: What Gnarly Computation Taught Me About Ultimate Reality, the Meaning Of Life, and How To Be Happy summarizes the various philosophies he's believed over the years and ends with the tentative conclusion that we might profitably view the world as made of computations, with the final remark, "perhaps this universe is perfect."

== Personal life ==
Rucker was the roommate of Kenneth Turan during his freshman year at Swarthmore College. In 1967, Rucker married Sylvia Bogsch Rucker (1943–2023). Together they had three children. On July 1, 2008, Rucker suffered a cerebral hemorrhage. Although Rucker quickly made a full recovery, he decided it was time to write Nested Scrolls, his autobiography.

Rucker resided in Highland Park, New Jersey during his graduate studies at Rutgers University.

== Works ==
=== Novels ===
The Ware Tetralogy

- Software (1982)
- Wetware (1988)
- Freeware (1997)
- Realware (2000)

Transreal Trilogy (Note: Arranged in the order of the events they describe.)

- The Secret of Life (1985)
- White Light (1980)
- Saucer Wisdom (1999) novel marketed as non-fiction

Transreal novels

- Spacetime Donuts (1981)
- The Sex Sphere (1983)
- Master of Space and Time (1984)
- The Hollow Earth (1990)
- The Hacker and the Ants (1994) (Revised 'Version 2.0' 2003)
- Spaceland (2002)
- Frek and the Elixir (2004)
- Mathematicians in Love (2006)
- Jim and the Flims (2011)
- The Big Aha (2013)
- All the Visions (1991), memoir/novel

Other novels

- As Above, So Below: A Novel of Peter Bruegel (2002)
- Postsingular (2007)
- Hylozoic (sequel to Postsingular, May 2009)
- Turing and Burroughs (2012)
- Return to the Hollow Earth (2018)
- Million Mile Road Trip (2019)
- Juicy Ghosts (2021)
- Sqinks (2025)

=== Short fiction ===
Collections

- The Fifty-Seventh Franz Kafka (1983)
- Transreal!, includes poetry and non-fiction essays (1991)
- Gnarl! (2000), complete short stories
- Mad Professor (2006)
- Surfing the Gnarl (2012), includes an essay and interview with the author
- Complete Stories (2012)
- Transreal Cyberpunk, with Bruce Sterling (2016)

Stories (by date of composition)

Written	Title	Published	First published	Notes
1976 (Spring)	Jumpin' Jack Flash	1983-01	The 57th Franz Kafka, Ace Books, January 1983	
1977	Enlightenment Rabies	1987-11	New Pathways, November 1987	
1979 (Spring)	Schrödinger's Cat	1981-03-30	Analog Science Fiction/Science Fact, March 30, 1981	
1979 (Summer)	Sufferin' Succotash	1983-01	The 57th Franz Kafka, Ace Books, January 1983	
1979 (Fall)	A New Golden Age	1981 (Summer)	The Randolph-Macon Woman's College Alumnae Bulletin, Summer 1981	
1979 (Fall)	Faraway Eyes	1980-09	Analog Science Fiction/Science Fact, September 1980	
1980 (Spring)	The 57th Franz Kafka	1982	The Little Magazine, 1982	
1980 (Spring)	The Indian Rope Trick Explained	1983-01	The 57th Franz Kafka, Ace Books, January 1983	
1980 (Spring)	A New Experiment With Time	1982 (Spring)	Sphinx, Spring 1982	
1980 (Spring)	The Man Who Ate Himself	1982-12	The Magazine of Fantasy and Science Fiction, December 1982	
1980 (Summer)	Tales of Houdini	1981-09	Elsewhere, Ace Books, September 1981	
1980 (Fall)	The Facts of Life	1983-12	The 57th Franz Kafka, Ace Books, January 1983	
1981 (Spring)	Buzz	1981-12	New Blood, December 1981	
1981 (Spring)	The Last Einstein-Rosen Bridge	1983-01	The 57th Franz Kafka, Ace Books, January 1983	
1981 (Summer)	Pac-Man	1982-06	Asimov's Science Fiction, June 1982	Originally published as "Peg-Man".
1981 (Fall)	Pi in the Sky	1983-01	The 57th Franz Kafka, Ace Books, January 1983	
1981 (Summer)	Wishloop	1988-12	San Jose State University Department of Mathematics and Computer Science Newsletter, December 1988	
1982 (Spring)	Inertia	1983-01	The Magazine of Fantasy and Science Fiction, January 1983	
1982 (Spring)	Bringing in the Sheaves	1987-01	Asimov's Science Fiction, January 1987	Slightly altered third chapter of Twinks (an unfinished science fiction novel that the author describes as "a punk post-WWIII book with radiation mutants").
1982 (Spring)	The Jack Kerouac Disembodied School of Poetics	1982-07	New Blood, July 1982	
1982 (Summer)	Message Found in a Copy of Flatland	1983-01	The 57th Franz Kafka, Ace Books, January 1983	
1982-11	Plastic Letters	1987	Live From the Stagger Café, Summer 1987	
1983	Monument to the Third International	1984-12	The Magazine of Fantasy and Science Fiction, December 1984	
1984 (Fall)	Rapture in Space	1989	Semiotext[e] SF, Autonomedia, 1989	
1985	Storming the Cosmos	1985-12	Asimov's Science Fiction, Mid-December 1985	Written with Bruce Sterling.
1985	In Frozen Time	1986-08	Afterlives, Vintage Books, August 1986	
1985	Soft Death	1986-09	The Magazine of Fantasy and Science Fiction, September 1986	
1986 (Summer)	Inside Out	1987	Synergy, Volume 1, HBJ Books, 1987	
1986-1987	Instability	1988-09	The Magazine of Fantasy and Science Fiction, September 1988	Written with Paul Di Filippo.
1987 (Spring)	The Man Who Was a Cosmic String	1987-11	The Universe, November 1987	
1987	Probability Pipeline	1988	Synergy, Volume 2, HBJ Books, 1988	Written with Marc Laidlaw.
1987	As Above, So Below	1989-11	The Microverse, Bantam Books, November 1989	
1988	Chaos Surfari	1989-03	Interzone, March/April 1989	Written with Marc Laidlaw.
1992	Big Jelly	1994-11	Asimov's Science Fiction, November 1994	Written with Bruce Sterling.
1993	Easy As Pie	1993-11	Christmas Forever, Tor Books, November 1993	
1995	The Andy Warhol Sandcandle	2000-04	Gnarl!, Four Walls Eight Windows, April 2000	Written with Marc Laidlaw.
1996-01	Cobb Wakes Up	2006-03	Other, March 2006	
1999	The Square Root of Pythagoras	1999-11	Science Fiction Age, November 1999	Written with Paul Di Filippo.
2000-07-18	Pockets	2001-12	Redshift, Roc Books, December 2001	Written with John Shirley.
2000-08-25 - 2001-03-05	A Dream of Flatland	2002-02-18	Infinite Matrix, February 18, 2002	Fifth chapter of Spaceland.
2001-12-29	Junk DNA	2003-01	Asimov's Science Fiction, January 2003	Written with Bruce Sterling.
2002-01-22	The Use of the Ellipse the Catalog the Meter & the Vibrating Plane	2002	Horror Garage, 2002	
2002-06-15	Jenna and Me	2003-02-11	Infinite Matrix, February 11, 2003	Written with Rudy Rucker Jr.
2003 (Fall)	Six Thought Experiments Concerning the Nature of Computation	2005-10	The Lifebox, the Seashell, and the Soul, Thunder's Mouth Press, October 2005	The story appears divided in 6 parts, each being a short-short story to introduce each of the six chapters in The Lifebox, the Seashell, and the Soul.
2004-04-09	Guadalupe and Hieronymus Bosch	2005-10	Interzone, October 2005	
2004-06-13	MS Found in a Minidrive	2006-05	Poe's Lighthouse, Cemetery Dance Publications, May 2006	
2004-05-06	The Men in the Back Room at the Country Club	2005-12-30	Infinite Matrix, December 30, 2005	
2005-09-19	Chu and the Nants	2006-06	Asimov's Science Fiction, June 2006	Second chapter of Postsingular.
2005-12-06	Panpsychism Proved	2006-01-26	Nature, January 26, 2006	
2005-12-06	Postsingular	2006-09	Asimov's Science Fiction, June 2006	Third and fourth chapters of Postsingular.
2006-03-25	Elves of the Subdimensions	2006-08-29	Flurb, Fall 2006	Written with Paul Di Filippo.
2006-05-01	2+2=5	2006-08	Interzone, August 2006	Written with Terry Bisson.
2006-05-22	Visions of the Metanovel	2007	Mad Professor, Thunder's Mouth Press, 2007	
2006 (Fall)	The Imitation Game	2008-04	Interzone, April 2008	First chapter of Turing and Burroughs.
2006-12	The Third Bomb	2006-12-19	Flurb, Winter 2006	
2007-03	Hormiga Canyon	2007-08	Asimov's Science Fiction, August 2007	Written with Bruce Sterling.
2007-05-25	Postsingular Outtakes	2007-04-23	Flurb, Spring–Summer 2007	Outtakes drawn from the author's working notes for Postsingular.
2007-05	The Perfect Wave	2008-01	Asimov's Science Fiction, January 2008	Written with Marc Laidlaw.
2007-09-11	Hieronymus Bosch's Apprentice	2007-09-19	Flurb, Fall–Winter 2007	Fifth chapter of Hylozoic.
2008-03	Tangier Routines	2008-03-31	Flurb, Spring–Summer 2008	
2008-05	Message Found In A Gravity Wave	2008-08	Nature Physics, August 2008	
2008-07	Qlone	2008-09-16	Flurb, Fall–Winter 2008	
2008-10	Colliding Branes	2009-02	Asimov's Science Fiction, February 2009	Written with Bruce Sterling.
2008-12	Jack and the Aktuals, or, Physical Applications of Transfinite Set Theory	2008-10-09	Tor.com, October 9, 2009	
2009-01	All Hangy	2009-03-03	Flurb, Spring–Summer 2009	Written with John Shirley.
2009-03	To See Infinity Bare	2011-03	Postscripts, March 2011	Written with Paul Di Filippo.
2009-08	Bad Ideas	2009-09-08	Flurb, Fall–Winter 2009	
2009-11-03	Val and Me	2010-03-08	Flurb, Spring–Summer 2010	First, second and third chapter of Jim and the Flims.
2010-06	Good Night, Moon	2010-10-13	Tor.com, October 13, 2010	Written with Bruce Sterling.
2010-07	The Fnoor Hen	2011-04	Asimov's Science Fiction, April/May 2011	
2010-08-10	The Skug	2010-08-31	Flurb, Fall–Winter 2010	Second chapter of Turing & Burroughs.
2010-09	Fjaerland	2011-09-06	Flurb, Fall–Winter 2011	Written with Paul DiFilippo.
2010-09	Hive Mind Man	2012-02	Asimov's Science Fiction, February 2012	Written with Eileen Gunn.
2011-01-01	Dispatches from Interzone	2011-03-22	Flurb, Spring–Summer 2011	Eighth chapter of Turing & Burroughs.
2011-03	My Office Mate	2011-07	Communications of the ACM, July 2011	
2011-12	Loco	2012-06-20	Tor.com, June 20, 2012	Written with Bruce Sterling.
2012-02-15	Jane and the Roadspider	2012-03-23	Flurb, Spring 2012	Second chapter of The Big Aha.
2012-07	I Arise Again	2013-01	Communications of the ACM, January 2013	Originally published as "Share My Enlightenment" and it slightly differs from the version that appears in the Complete Stories under the title "I Arise Again".
2012-10	Yubba Vines	2013-07	Asimov's Science Fiction, July 2013	Written with Paul Di Filippo.
2012-10	Quantum Telepathy	2014-09	Hieroglyph, William Morrow, September 2014	First and third chapters of The Big Aha.
2013-03	Apricot Lane	2013-05	An Aura of Familiarity, Institute for the Future, May 2013	
2014-01	Where the Lost Things Are	2014-11-05	Tor.com, November 5, 2014	Written with Terry Bisson.
2014-02	Laser Shades	2014-11	The Superlative Light, Daylight Books, November 2014	
2014-05	Attack of the Giant Ants	2014-12-09	Terraform, December 2014	
2014-06 – 2014–12	Totem Poles	2016-08-10	Tor.com, August 10, 2016	Written with Bruce Sterling.
2014-08	Watergirl	2015-01	Asimov's Science Fiction, January 2015	Written with Marc Laidlaw.
2014-12	The Knobby Giraffe	2016-04	Lightspeed, April 2016	
2015-03 – 2015–08	Kraken and Sage	2016-02	Transreal Cyberpunk, Transreal Books, February 2016	Written with Bruce Sterling.
2015-06	Like a Sea Cucumber	2015-06-30	Terraform, June 2015	
2016-07	Emojis	2018-03	Asimov's Science Fiction, March 2018	
2016-08 – 2016–12	@lantis	2017-07	Asimov's Science Fiction, July/August 2017	Written with Marc Laidlaw.
2016-12	Fat Stream	2017-08-21	Mondo2000.com, August 21, 2017	
2017-04	In The Lost City of Leng	2018-01	Asimov's Science Fiction, January 2018	Written with Paul Di Filippo. According to the Rudy Rucker's notes from February 15, 2017, the working title was "The Plateau of Leng".
2018-11 – 2019–01	Surfers at the End of Time	2019-11	Asimov's Science Fiction, November/December 2019	Written with Marc Laidlaw.
2019-01 – 2019–06	Juicy Ghost	2019-06-24	Rudy's Blog, June 24, 2019	Third chapter of Juicy Ghosts. Reprinted in Big Echo, October 2019. Rewritten in September 2020 and published in the author's blog.
	The Mean Carrot	2020-03	Big Echo, March 2020	First chapter of Juicy Ghosts.
2019-08 – 2020–09	Everything Is Everything	2020-10	Big Echo, October 2020	
	Mary Mary	2021-03	Asimov's Science Fiction, March/April 2021	Fourth chapter of Juicy Ghosts. According to the author's blog post, an early title was "Mary Falls".
2019-11 – 2020–06	Fibonacci's Humors	2021-07	Asimov's Science Fiction, July/August 2021	Written with Bruce Sterling.
	Petroglyph Man	2015-07	Rucker, Rudy (July 2015). "Petroglyph Man". Asimov's Science Fiction. 39 (7): 60–68.	

=== Non-fiction ===
- Geometry, Relativity and the Fourth Dimension (1977)
- Infinity and the Mind (1982)
- The Fourth Dimension: Toward a Geometry of Higher Reality (1984)
- Mind Tools (1987)
- Seek! (1999), collected essays
- Software Engineering and Computer Games (2002), textbook
- The Lifebox, the Seashell, and the Soul: What Gnarly Computation Taught Me About Ultimate Reality, the Meaning of Life, and How to Be Happy (Thunder's Mouth Press, 2005)
- Nested Scrolls - autobiography (2011)
- Collected Essays (2012)
- How to Make an Ebook (2012)
- Better Worlds (2013), art book of Rucker's paintings
- Journals 1990–2014 (2015)

=== As editor ===
- Speculations on the Fourth Dimension: Selected Writings of Charles H. Hinton, Dover (1980), ISBN 0-486-23916-0
- Mathenauts: Tales of Mathematical Wonder, Arbor House (1987)
- Semiotext(e) SF, Autonomedia (1989)

=== Critical studies and reviews of Rucker's work ===
The big aha

- Spinrad, Norman (October–November 2014). "Space—the permanent frontier". On Books. Asimov's Science Fiction. 38 (10–11): 183–191.

Turing and Burroughs

- Spinrad, Norman (October–November 2013). "Genre versus literature". On Books. Asimov's Science Fiction. 37 (10–11): 182–191.

== Filmography ==
Rudy Rucker on the set Manual of Evasion LX94. (Photo: Ithaka Darin Pappas)

- Rudy Rucker appeared as an actor and speaker in Manual of Evasion LX94 (Manual Of Evasion LX94), a surreal 1994 Dadaist documentary by renowned Portuguese director Edgar Pêra. In the film, one of Rucker's principal subjects was, Can the future affect the present?

The movie was filmed in Lisbon, Portugal and also featured Terence McKenna and Robert Anton Wilson.
