= Transrealism (literature) =

Literary mode used in science fiction

Transrealism is a literary mode that mixes the techniques of incorporating fantastic elements used in science fiction with the techniques of describing immediate perceptions from naturalistic realism. While combining the strengths of the two approaches, it is largely a reaction to their perceived weaknesses. Transrealism addresses the escapism and disconnect with reality of science fiction by providing for superior characterization through autobiographical features and simulation of the author's acquaintances. It addresses the tiredness and boundaries of realism by using fantastic elements to create new metaphors for psychological change and to incorporate the author's perception of a higher reality in which life is embedded. One possible source for this higher reality is the increasingly strange models of the universe put forward in theoretical astrophysics.

Its main proponent and prominent figure is science fiction author Rudy Rucker. Rucker coined the term "transrealism" after reading Philip K Dick's A Scanner Darkly described as "transcendental autobiography," and expounded the principles of transrealism in a short essay titled "A Transrealist Manifesto" in 1983. Rucker applied many of these principles in his short stories and novels, notably White Light and Saucer Wisdom. Damien Broderick has identified some other authors that have at some time utilized transrealist tropes to include Martin Amis, Margaret Atwood, Iain Banks, John Barth, J. G. Ballard, John Calvin Batchelor, Jonathan Carroll, Philip K. Dick especially, Karen Joy Fowler, Lisa Goldstein, James Morrow, Thomas Pynchon, Joanna Russ and James Tiptree Jr.

Damien Broderick argues that a state of perception (termed transreality) that is playfully contrary to consensus reality is a prerequisite for writing effective transrealist fiction. The necessary viewpoint is playful in the sense that the author does not need to literally believe the fantastic interpretation of the perception and may support and undermine it through reference to speculative science. An example of this can be seen in Rucker's blog, where he discusses an experience in an airport terminal. In a 2014 essay, Damien Walter argued that science fiction and other literature were increasingly converging, and that the refusal of plot and "archetypal" characters in transrealism is "meant to be uncomfortable, by telling us that our reality is at best constructed, at worst non-existent".

Transrealism's stance against consensus reality identifies it as a postmodern literature akin to surrealism and covering much the same ground as slipstream literature. Transrealism may be considered a subset of slipstream, depending on how the latter term is defined, or as Broderick posits, slipstream may be very nearly the same thing as transrealism. Broderick also argues that the approach to literature offered by science fiction as a whole, including both transrealism and slipstream, becomes more crucial as society possibly approaches a technological singularity.

== Sources ==
- Broderick, Damien (2000). Transrealist Fiction: Writing in the Slipstream of Science. Westport, CT: Greenwood Press. ISBN 0-313-31121-8
