= Digital number =

Digital number may refer to:

- Numerical digit, the general concept of a digit-based numbering systems
- Specific digital number systems such as:
  - binary numeral system
  - octal
  - decimal
  - hexadecimal
- Seven-segment display character representation, the "digital" font commonly associated with LED displays on calculators
- The pixel value assigned by an analog-to-digital converter

== See also ==
- List of numeral systems
- Roman numerals, an example of a non-positional numeral system
