= Timeline of numerals and arithmetic =

A timeline of numerals and arithmetic.

== Before 2000 BC ==
- c. 20,000 BC — Nile Valley, Ishango Bone: suggested, though disputed, as the earliest reference to prime numbers as also a common number.
- c. 3400 BC — the Sumerians invent the first so-known numeral system, and a system of weights and measures.
- c. 3100 BC — Egypt, earliest known decimal system allows indefinite counting by way of introducing new symbols, .
- c. 2800 BC — Indus Valley civilization on the Indian subcontinent, earliest use of decimal ratios in a uniform system of ancient weights and measures, the smallest unit of measurement used is 1.704 millimetres and the smallest unit of mass used is 28 grams.
- c. 2000 BC — Mesopotamia, the Babylonians use a base-60 decimal system, and compute the first known approximate value of π at 3.125.

== 1st millennium BC ==
- c. 1000 BC — Vulgar fractions used by the Egyptians.
- second half of 1st millennium BC — The Lo Shu Square, the unique normal magic square of order three, was discovered in China.
- c. 400 BC — Jaina mathematicians in India write the “Surya Prajinapti”, a mathematical text which classifies all numbers into three sets: enumerable, innumerable and infinite. It also recognises five different types of infinity: infinite in one and two directions, infinite in area, infinite everywhere, and infinite perpetually.
- c. 300 BC — Brahmi numerals are conceived in India.
- 300 BC — Mesopotamia, the Babylonians invent the earliest calculator, the abacus.
- c. 300 BC — Indian mathematician Pingala writes the “Chhandah-shastra”, which contains the first Indian use of zero as a digit (indicated by a dot) and also presents a description of a binary numeral system, along with the first use of Fibonacci numbers and Pascal's triangle.
- c. 250 BC — late Olmecs had already begun to use a true zero (a shell glyph) several centuries before Ptolemy in the New World. See 0 (number).
- 150 BC — Jain mathematicians in India write the “Sthananga Sutra”, which contains work on the theory of numbers, arithmetical operations, geometry, operations with fractions, simple equations, cubic equations, quartic equations, and permutations and combinations.
- 50 BC — Indian numerals, the first positional notation base-10 numeral system, begins developing in India.

== 1st millennium AD ==
- 300 — the earliest known use of zero as a decimal digit in the Old World is introduced by Indian mathematicians.
- c. 400 — the Bakhshali manuscript uses numerals with a place-value system, using a dot as a place holder for zero .
- 550 — Hindu mathematicians give zero a numeral representation in the positional notation Indian numeral system.
- 628 — Brahmagupta writes the Brahma-sphuta-siddhanta, where zero is clearly explained, and where the modern place-value Indian numeral system is fully developed. It also gives rules for manipulating both negative and positive numbers, methods for computing square roots, methods of solving linear and quadratic equations, and rules for summing series, Brahmagupta's identity, and the Brahmagupta theorem.
- 940 — Abu'l-Wafa al-Buzjani extracts roots using the Indian numeral system.
- 953 — The arithmetic of the Hindu–Arabic numeral system at first required the use of a dust board (a sort of handheld blackboard) because “the methods required moving the numbers around in the calculation and rubbing some out as the calculation proceeded.” Al-Uqlidisi modified these methods for pen and paper use. Eventually the advances enabled by the decimal system led to its standard use throughout the region and the world.

== 1000–1500 ==
- c. 1000 — Pope Sylvester II introduces the abacus using the Hindu–Arabic numeral system to Europe.
- 1030 — Ali Ahmad Nasawi writes a treatise on the decimal and sexagesimal number systems. His arithmetic explains the division of fractions and the extraction of square and cubic roots (square root of 57,342; cubic root of 3, 652, 296) in an almost modern manner.
- 12th century — Indian numerals have been modified by Persian mathematicians al-Khwārizmī to form the modern Arabic numerals (used universally in the modern world.)
- 12th century — the Arabic numerals reach Europe through the Arabs.
- 1202 — Leonardo Fibonacci demonstrates the utility of Hindu–Arabic numeral system in his Book of the Abacus.
- c. 1400 — Ghiyath al-Kashi “contributed to the development of decimal fractions not only for approximating algebraic numbers, but also for real numbers such as pi. His contribution to decimal fractions is so major that for many years he was considered as their inventor. Although not the first to do so, al-Kashi gave an algorithm for calculating nth roots which is a special case of the methods given many centuries later by Ruffini and Horner.” He is also the first to use the decimal point notation in arithmetic and Arabic numerals. His works include The Key of arithmetics, Discoveries in mathematics, The Decimal point, and The benefits of the zero. The contents of the Benefits of the Zero are an introduction followed by five essays: “On whole number arithmetic”, “On fractional arithmetic”, “On astrology”, “On areas”, and “On finding the unknowns [unknown variables]”. He also wrote the Thesis on the sine and the chord and Thesis on finding the first degree sine.
- 15th century — Ibn al-Banna and al-Qalasadi introduced symbolic notation for algebra and for mathematics in general.
- 1427 — Al-Kashi completes The Key to Arithmetic containing work of great depth on decimal fractions. It applies arithmetical and algebraic methods to the solution of various problems, including several geometric ones.
- 1478 — An anonymous author writes the Treviso Arithmetic.

== 17th century ==
- 1614 — John Napier publishes a table of Napierian logarithms in Mirifici Logarithmorum Canonis Descriptio,
- 1617 — Henry Briggs discusses decimal logarithms in Logarithmorum Chilias Prima,
- 1618 — John Napier publishes the first references to e in a work on logarithms.

== 18th century ==
- 1758 — Arithmetika Horvatzka, Croatia's first arithmetic textbook is published in Zagreb by Mihalj Šilobod Bolšić (1724–1787).
- 1794 — Jurij Vega publishes Thesaurus Logarithmorum Completus.

== Calculation of Pi ==
- 1706 — John Machin develops a quickly converging inverse-tangent series for π and computes π to 100 decimal places.
- 1789 — Jurij Vega improves Machin's formula and computes π to 140 decimal places.
- 1949 — John von Neumann computes π to 2,037 decimal places using ENIAC.
- 1961 — Daniel Shanks and John Wrench compute π to 100,000 decimal places using an inverse-tangent identity and an IBM-7090 computer.
- 1987 — Yasumasa Kanada, David Bailey, Jonathan Borwein, and Peter Borwein use iterative modular equation approximations to elliptic integrals and a NEC SX-2 supercomputer to compute π to 134 million decimal places.
- 2002 — Yasumasa Kanada, Y. Ushiro, Hisayasu Kuroda, Makoto Kudoh and a team of nine more compute π to 1241.1 billion digits using a Hitachi 64-node supercomputer.

== See also ==
- Abacus – Calculating tool
- Alphabetic numeral system – Type of numeral system
- Attic numerals – Symbolic number notation used by the ancient Greeks
- Australian Aboriginal enumeration – Counting system used by Australian Aboriginals
- Counting rods – Small bars used for calculating in ancient East Asia
- History of ancient numeral systems – Symbols representing numbers
- History of arithmetic – Branch of elementary mathematics
- History of mathematics
- History of numbers – Used to count, measure, and label
- History of the Hindu–Arabic numeral system
- Jeton – Coin-like counting token
- List of numeral system topics
- List of numeral systems
- Number theory – Branch of mathematics
- Prehistoric counting – Numeral form used for counting
- Relationship between mathematics and physics
- Roman numerals – Numbers in the Roman numeral system
- Timeline of algorithms
- Timeline of mathematics
