= List of numeral system topics =

This is a list of Wikipedia articles on topics of numeral system and "numeric representations"

See also: computer numbering formats and number names.

== Arranged by base ==
- Radix, radix point, mixed radix, exponentiation
- Unary numeral system (base 1)
  - Tally marks – Numeral form used for counting
- Binary numeral system (base 2)
- Negative base numeral system (base −2)
- Ternary numeral system numeral system (base 3)
- Balanced ternary numeral system (base 3)
- Negative base numeral system (base −3)
- Quaternary numeral system (base 4)
- Quater-imaginary base (base 2i)
- Quinary numeral system (base 5)
  - Pentadic numerals – Scandinavian numeral system
- Senary numeral system (base 6)
- Septenary numeral system (base 7)
- Octal numeral system (base 8)
- Nonary (novenary) numeral system (base 9)
- Decimal (denary) numeral system (base 10)
  - Bi-quinary coded decimal – Numeral encoding scheme
- Negative base numeral system (base −10)
- Duodecimal (dozenal) numeral system (base 12)
- Hexadecimal numeral system (base 16)
- Vigesimal numeral system (base 20)
- Sexagesimal numeral system (base 60)

== Arranged by culture ==
- Aegean numbers – Numeral system used by the Minoans and Mycenaeans
- Australian Aboriginal enumeration – Counting system used by Australian Aboriginals
- Armenian numerals
- Babylonian numerals – Numeral system
- Chinese numerals – Characters used to denote numbers in Chinese
  - Counting rods – Small bars used for calculating in ancient East Asia
- Cyrillic numerals – Numeral system derived from the Cyrillic script
- Greek numerals – System of writing numbers using Greek letters
  - Attic numerals – Symbolic number notation used by the ancient Greeks
- Hebrew numerals – Numeral system using letters of the Hebrew alphabet
- Hindu–Arabic numeral system – Most common system for writing numbers
  - Arabic numerals – Symbols 0, 1, 2, 3, 4, 5, 6, 7, 8, and 9
  - Eastern Arabic numerals – Numerals used in the eastern Arab world and Asia
  - Indian numerals – Most common system for writing numbers
  - Thai numerals – Notation for expressing numbers in Thai
- Japanese numerals – Number words used in the Japanese language
- Korean numerals – Numbers in traditional Korean writing
- Maya numerals – System used by the ancient Mayan civilization to represent numbers and dates
- Prehistoric numerals – Numeral form used for counting
- Roman numerals – Numbers in the Roman numeral system
- Welsh numerals – Counting system of the Welsh language

== Other ==
- Algorism – Mathematical technique for arithmetic
- Goodstein's theorem – Theorem about natural numbers
- History of ancient numeral systems
- Long and short scales – Different meanings for numbers
- Myriad – Order of magnitude name for 10,000
- Non-standard positional numeral systems – Types of numeral system
- Quipu – Andean record-keeping system using knotted cords
- Tally stick – Memory aid device
- Tally mark – Numeral form used for counting
- -yllion – Mathematical notation
