= Numerical digit =

Symbols used to write numbers

The ten digits of the Arabic numerals, in order of value

A numerical digit (often shortened to just digit) is a single symbol used to represent numbers in positional notation, such as 0, 1, ..., 9 in the common base 10. The name "digit" originates from the Latin digiti, meaning fingers. Digits may be used alone (such as "1") or in combinations (such as in "15") to form a numeral.

For any numeral system with an integer base, the number of different digits required is the absolute value of the base. For example, decimal (base 10) requires ten digits (0 to 9), and binary (base 2) requires only two digits (0 and 1). Bases greater than 10 require more than 10 digits, for instance hexadecimal (base 16) requires 16 digits (usually 0 to 9 and A to F).

== Overview ==
In a basic digital system, a numeral is a sequence of digits, which may be of arbitrary length. Each position in the sequence has a place value, and each digit has a value. The value of the numeral is computed by multiplying each digit in the sequence by its place value, and summing the results.

=== Digital values ===
Each digit in a number system represents an integer. For example, in decimal the digit "1" represents the integer one, and in the hexadecimal system, the letter "A" represents the number ten. A positional number system has one unique digit for each integer from zero up to, but not including, the radix of the number system.

Thus in the positional decimal system, the numbers 0 to 9 can be expressed using their respective numerals "0" to "9" in the rightmost "units" position. The number 12 is expressed with the numeral "2" in the units position, and with the numeral "1" in the "tens" position, to the left of the "2" while the number 312 is expressed with three numerals: "3" in the "hundreds" position, "1" in the "tens" position, and "2" in the "units" position.

=== Computation of place values ===
The decimal numeral system uses a decimal separator, commonly a period in English, or a comma in other European languages, to denote the "ones place" or "units place", which has a place value one. Each successive place to the left of this has a place value equal to the place value of the previous digit times the base. Similarly, each successive place to the right of the separator has a place value equal to the place value of the previous digit divided by the base. For example, in the numeral 10.34 (written in base 10),

the 0 is immediately to the left of the separator, so it is in the ones or units place, and is called the units digit or ones digit;
the 1 to the left of the ones place is in the tens place, and is called the tens digit;
the 3 is to the right of the ones place, so it is in the tenths place, and is called the tenths digit;
the 4 to the right of the tenths place is in the hundredths place, and is called the hundredths digit.

The total value of the number is 1 ten, 0 ones, 3 tenths, and 4 hundredths. The zero, which contributes no value to the number, indicates that the 1 is in the tens place rather than the ones place.

The place value of any given digit in a numeral can be given by a simple calculation, which in itself is a complement to the logic behind numeral systems. The calculation involves the multiplication of the given digit by the base raised by the exponent n − 1, where n represents the position of the digit from the separator; the value of n is positive (+), but this is only if the digit is to the left of the separator. And to the right, the digit is multiplied by the base raised by a negative (−) n. For example, in the number 10.34 (written in base 10),

the 1 is second to the left of the separator, so based on calculation, its value is,

$$n - 1 = 2 - 1 = 1$$

$$1 \times 10^1 = 10$$

the 4 is second to the right of the separator, so based on calculation its value is,

$$n = -2$$

$$4 \times 10^{-2} = \frac{4}{100}$$

== History ==
Western Arabic	0	1	2	3	4	5	6	7	8	9
Eastern Arabic	٠	١	٢	٣	٤	٥	٦	٧	٨	٩
Persian	۰	۱	۲	۳	۴	۵	۶	۷	۸	۹
Devanagari	०	१	२	३	४	५	६	७	८	९
Kadamba	೦	೧	೨	೩	೪	೫	೬	೭	೮	೯

The first true written positional numeral system is considered to be the Hindu–Arabic numeral system. This system was established by the 7th century in India, but was not yet in its modern form because the use of the digit zero had not yet been widely accepted. Instead of a zero sometimes the digits were marked with dots to indicate their significance, or a space was used as a placeholder. The first widely acknowledged use of zero was in 876. The original numerals were very similar to the modern ones, even down to the glyphs used to represent digits.

By the 13th century, Western Arabic numerals were accepted in European mathematical circles (Fibonacci used them in his Liber Abaci). They began to enter common use in the 15th century. By the end of the 20th century virtually all non-computerized calculations in the world were done with Arabic numerals, which have replaced native numeral systems in most cultures.

=== Other historical numeral systems using digits ===
The digits of the Maya numeral system

The exact age of the Maya numerals is unclear, but it is possible that it is older than the Hindu–Arabic system. The system was vigesimal (base 20), so it has twenty digits. The Mayas used a shell symbol to represent zero. Numerals were written vertically, with the ones place at the bottom. The Mayas had no equivalent of the modern decimal separator, so their system could not represent fractions.

The Thai numeral system is identical to the Hindu–Arabic numeral system except for the symbols used to represent digits. The use of these digits is less common in Thailand than it once was, but they are still used alongside Arabic numerals.

The rod numerals, the written forms of counting rods once used by Chinese and Japanese mathematicians, are a decimal positional system able to represent not only zero but also negative numbers. Counting rods themselves predate the Hindu–Arabic numeral system. The Suzhou numerals are variants of rod numerals.

Rod numerals (vertical)
0	1	2	3	4	5	6	7	8	9
−0	−1	−2	−3	−4	−5	−6	−7	−8	−9

== Modern digital systems ==
=== In computer science ===
The binary (base 2), octal (base 8), and hexadecimal (base 16) systems, extensively used in computer science, all follow the conventions of the Hindu–Arabic numeral system. The binary system uses only the digits "0" and "1", while the octal system uses the digits from "0" through "7". The hexadecimal system uses all the digits from the decimal system, plus the letters "A" through "F", which represent the numbers 10 to 15 respectively. When the binary system is used, the term "bit(s)" is typically used as an alternative for "digit(s)", being a portmanteau of the term "binary digit".

=== Unusual systems ===
The ternary and balanced ternary systems have sometimes been used. They are both base 3 systems.

Balanced ternary is unusual in having the digit values 1, 0 and −1. Balanced ternary turns out to have some useful properties and the system has been used in the experimental Russian Setun computers.

Several authors in the last 300 years have noted a facility of positional notation that amounts to a modified decimal representation. Some advantages are cited for use of numerical digits that represent negative values. In 1840 Augustin-Louis Cauchy advocated use of signed-digit representation of numbers, and in 1928 Florian Cajori presented his collection of references for negative numerals. The concept of signed-digit representation has also been taken up in computer design.

== Digits in mathematics ==
Despite the essential role of digits in describing numbers, they are relatively unimportant to modern mathematics. Nevertheless, there are a few important mathematical concepts that make use of the representation of a number as a sequence of digits.

=== Digital roots ===
The digital root is the single-digit number obtained by summing the digits of a given number, then summing the digits of the result, and so on until a single-digit number is obtained.

=== Casting out nines ===
Casting out nines is a procedure for checking arithmetic done by hand. To describe it, let $f(x)$ represent the digital root of $x$, as described above. Casting out nines makes use of the fact that if $A + B = C$, then $f(f(A) + f(B)) = f(C)$. In the process of casting out nines, both sides of the latter equation are computed, and if they are not equal, the original addition must have been faulty.

=== Repunits and repdigits ===
Repunits are integers that are represented with only the digit 1. For example, 1111 (one thousand, one hundred and eleven) is a repunit. Repdigits are a generalization of repunits; they are integers represented by repeated instances of the same digit. For example, 333 is a repdigit. The primality of repunits is of interest to mathematicians.

=== Palindromic numbers and Lychrel numbers ===
Palindromic numbers are numbers that read the same when their digits are reversed. A Lychrel number is a positive integer that never yields a palindromic number when subjected to the iterative process of being added to itself with digits reversed. The question of whether there are any Lychrel numbers in base 10 is an open problem in recreational mathematics; the smallest candidate is 196.

== History of ancient numbers ==
Counting aids, especially the use of body parts (counting on fingers), were certainly used in prehistoric times as today. There are many variations. Besides counting ten fingers, some cultures have counted knuckles, the space between fingers, and toes as well as fingers. The Oksapmin culture of New Guinea uses a system of 27 upper body locations to represent numbers.

To preserve numerical information, tallies carved in wood, bone, and stone have been used since prehistoric times. Stone age cultures, including ancient indigenous American groups, used tallies for gambling, personal services, and trade-goods.

A method of preserving numeric information in clay was invented by the Sumerians between 8000 and 3500 BC. This was done with small clay tokens of various shapes that were strung like beads on a string. Beginning about 3500 BC, clay tokens were gradually replaced by number signs impressed with a round stylus at different angles in clay tablets (originally containers for tokens) which were then baked. About 3100 BC, written numbers were dissociated from the things being counted and became abstract numerals.

Between 2700 and 2000 BC, in Sumer, the round stylus was gradually replaced by a reed stylus that was used to press wedge-shaped cuneiform signs in clay. These cuneiform number signs resembled the round number signs they replaced and retained the additive sign-value notation of the round number signs. These systems gradually converged on a common sexagesimal number system; this was a place-value system consisting of only two impressed marks, the vertical wedge and the chevron, which could also represent fractions. This sexagesimal number system was fully developed at the beginning of the Old Babylonia period (about 1950 BC) and became standard in Babylonia.

Sexagesimal numerals were a mixed radix system that retained the alternating base 10 and base 6 in a sequence of cuneiform vertical wedges and chevrons. By 1950 BC, this was a positional notation system. Sexagesimal numerals came to be widely used in commerce, but were also used in astronomical and other calculations. This system was exported from Babylonia and used throughout Mesopotamia, and by every Mediterranean nation that used standard Babylonian units of measure and counting, including the Greeks, Romans and Egyptians. Babylonian-style sexagesimal numeration is still used in modern societies to measure time (minutes per hour) and angles (degrees).

== History of modern numbers ==
In China, armies and provisions were counted using modular tallies of prime numbers. Unique numbers of troops and measures of rice appear as unique combinations of these tallies. A great convenience of modular arithmetic is that it is easy to multiply. This makes use of modular arithmetic for provisions especially attractive. Conventional tallies are quite difficult to multiply and divide. In modern times modular arithmetic is sometimes used in digital signal processing.

The oldest Greek system was that of the Attic numerals, but in the 4th century BC they began to use a quasidecimal alphabetic system (see Greek numerals). Jews began using a similar system (Hebrew numerals), with the oldest examples known being coins from around 100 BC.

The Roman empire used tallies written on wax, papyrus and stone, and roughly followed the Greek custom of assigning letters to various numbers. The Roman numerals system remained in common use in Europe until positional notation came into common use in the 16th century.

The Maya of Central America used a mixed base 18 and base 20 system, possibly inherited from the Olmec, including advanced features such as positional notation and a zero. They used this system to make advanced astronomical calculations, including highly accurate calculations of the length of the solar year and the orbit of Venus.

The Incan Empire ran a large command economy using quipu, tallies made by knotting colored fibers. Knowledge of the encodings of the knots and colors was suppressed by the Spanish conquistadors in the 16th century, and has not survived although simple quipu-like recording devices are still used in the Andean region.

Some authorities believe that positional arithmetic began with the wide use of counting rods in China. The earliest written positional records seem to be rod calculus results in China around 400. Zero was first used in India in the 7th century CE by Brahmagupta.

The modern positional Arabic numeral system was developed by mathematicians in India, and passed on to Muslim mathematicians, along with astronomical tables brought to Baghdad by an Indian ambassador around 773.

From India, the thriving trade between Islamic sultans and Africa carried the concept to Cairo. Arabic mathematicians extended the system to include decimal fractions, and Muḥammad ibn Mūsā al-Ḵwārizmī wrote an important work about it in the 9th century. The modern Arabic numerals were introduced to Europe with the translation of this work in the 12th century in Spain and Leonardo of Pisa's Liber Abaci of 1201. In Europe, the complete Indian system with the zero was derived from the Arabs in the 12th century.

The binary system (base 2) was propagated in the 17th century by Gottfried Leibniz. Leibniz had developed the concept early in his career, and had revisited it when he reviewed a copy of the I Ching from China. Binary numbers came into common use in the 20th century because of computer applications.

=== Numerals in most popular systems ===
West Arabic	0	1	2	3	4	5	6	7	8	9
Asomiya (Assamese); Bengali	০	১	২	৩	৪	৫	৬	৭	৮	৯
Devanagari	०	१	२	३	४	५	६	७	८	९
East Arabic	٠	١	٢	٣	٤	٥	٦	٧	٨	٩
Persian	٠	١	٢	٣	۴	۵	۶	٧	٨	٩
Gurmukhi	੦	੧	੨	੩	੪	੫	੬	੭	੮	੯
Urdu	۰	۱	۲	۳	۴	۵	۶	۷	۸	۹
Chinese (everyday)	零	一	二	三	四	五	六	七	八	九
Chinese (Traditional)	零	壹	貳	叄	肆	伍	陸	柒	捌	玖
Chinese (Simplified)	零	壹	贰	叁	肆	伍	陆	柒	捌	玖
Chinese (Suzhou)	〇	〡	〢	〣	〤	〥	〦	〧	〨	〩
Ge'ez (Ethiopic)		፩	፪	፫	፬	፭	፮	፯	፰	፱
Gujarati	૦	૧	૨	૩	૪	૫	૬	૭	૮	૯
Hieroglyphic Egyptian		𓏺	𓏻	𓏼	𓏽	𓏾	𓏿	𓐀	𓐁	𓐂
Japanese (everyday)	〇	一	二	三	四	五	六	七	八	九
Japanese (formal)	零	壱	弐	参	四	五	六	七	八	九
Kannada	೦	೧	೨	೩	೪	೫	೬	೭	೮	೯
Khmer (Cambodia)	០	១	២	៣	៤	៥	៦	៧	៨	៩
Lao	໐	໑	໒	໓	໔	໕	໖	໗	໘	໙
Limbu	᥆	᥇	᥈	᥉	᥊	᥋	᥌	᥍	᥎	᥏
Malayalam	൦	൧	൨	൩	൪	൫	൬	൭	൮	൯
Mongolian	᠐	᠑	᠒	᠓	᠔	᠕	᠖	᠗	᠘	᠙
Burmese	၀	၁	၂	၃	၄	၅	၆	၇	၈	၉
Oriya	୦	୧	୨	୩	୪	୫	୬	୭	୮	୯
Roman		I	II	III	IV	V	VI	VII	VIII	IX
Shan	႐	႑	႒	႓	႔	႕	႖	႗	႘	႙
Sinhala		𑇡	𑇢	𑇣	𑇤	𑇥	𑇦	𑇧	𑇨	𑇩
Tamil	௦	௧	௨	௩	௪	௫	௬	௭	௮	௯
Telugu	౦	౧	౨	౩	౪	౫	౬	౭	౮	౯
Thai	๐	๑	๒	๓	๔	๕	๖	๗	๘	๙
Tibetan	༠	༡	༢	༣	༤	༥	༦	༧	༨	༩
New Tai Lue	᧐	᧑	᧒	᧓	᧔	᧕	᧖	᧗	᧘	᧙
Javanese	꧐	꧑	꧒	꧓	꧔	꧕	꧖	꧗	꧘	꧙

=== Additional numerals ===
	1	5	10	20	30	40	50	60	70	80	90	100	500	1000	10000	10^{8}
Chinese (ordinary)	一	五	十	二十	三十	四十	五十	六十	七十	八十	九十	百	五百	千	万	亿
Chinese (financial)	壹	伍	拾	贰拾	叁拾	肆拾	伍拾	陆拾	柒拾	捌拾	玖拾	佰	伍佰	仟	萬	億
Geʽez	፩	፭	፲	፳	፴	፵	፶	፷	፸	፹	፺	፻	፭፻	፲፻	፼	፼፼
Roman	I	V	X	XX	XXX	XL	L	LX	LXX	LXXX	XC	C	D	M	X̅	

== See also ==
- List of numeral systems
- List of numeral system topics
- Binary digit
- Hexadecimal digit
- Natural unit of information
- Abacus
- Significant figures
- Text figures
- Alphabetic numeral system
