= Greek numerals =

System of writing numbers using Greek letters

Roman milestone with Roman numerals CCↆX (100+100+50+10); at bottom is its Greek equivalent, ΣΞ (200+60); the stone marks 260 Roman miles from Philippi.

Greek numerals, also known as Ionic, Ionian, Milesian, or Alexandrian numerals, is a system of writing numbers using the letters of the Greek alphabet. In modern Greece, they are still used for ordinal numbers and in contexts similar to those in which Roman numerals are still used in the Western world. For ordinary cardinal numbers, however, modern Greece uses Arabic numerals.

== History ==
The Minoan and Mycenaean civilizations' Linear A and Linear B alphabets used a different system, called Aegean numerals, which included number-only symbols for powers of ten: 𐄇 = 1, 𐄐 = 10, 𐄙 = 100, 𐄢 = 1,000, and 𐄫 = 10,000.

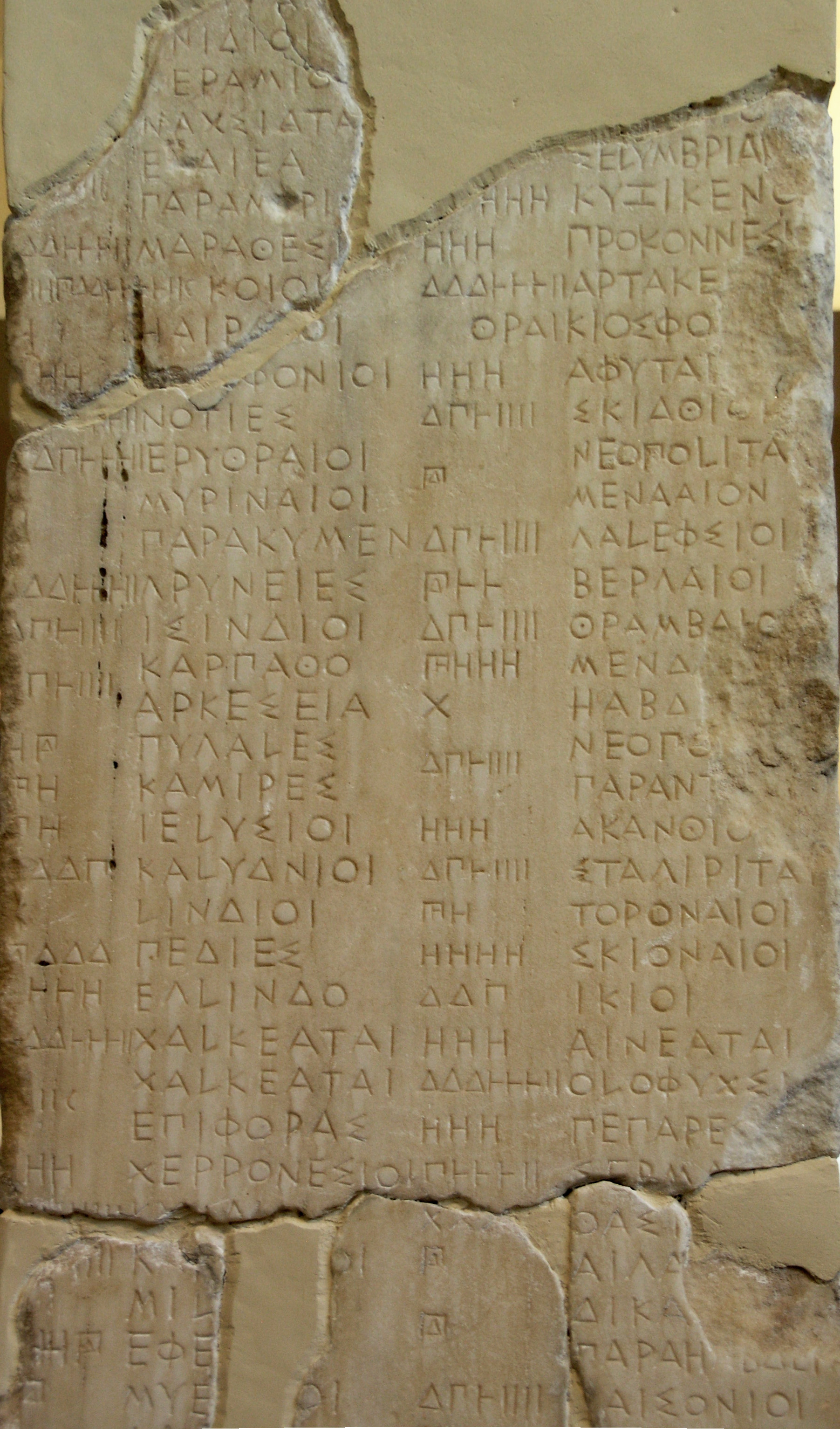
Tribute list using attic numerals, 430s BCE

In the classical times two different systems of notation were used side by side: Firstly, an acrophonic system called Attic numerals -- also known as Herodianic signs -- and, secondly, alphabetic numerals. The Attic numerals ran from = 1, = 5, = 10, = 100, = 1,000, and = 10,000. These were repeated at most four times; so, 50, 500, 5,000 and 50,000 were represented by the letter with minuscule powers of ten written in the top-right corner:,,, and. The Attic numerals were probably in use by the time of Solon in the 7th century BCE, and instances of it are found from 454 BCE to 95 BCE.

The alphabetic numerals used (all 24) letters of the Greek alphabet together with three Phoenician and Ionic ones that had been dropped from the Athenian alphabet (although kept for numbers): digamma, koppa, and sampi. in three sets of nine letters representing ones, tens, and hundreds: From = 1 to = 9, from = 10 to = 90, and from = 100 to or = 900. However, some signs vary from location to location due to different local alphabets being in use. This system probably developed around Miletus in Ionia, and 19th century classicists placed its development in the 3rd century BCE, the occasion of its first widespread use. This system was in limited use from at least 350 BCE, but the first official use of the alphabetic system in Greece proper is from c.a. 200 BCE.

More thorough modern archaeology has caused the date to be pushed back at least to the 5th century BCE, a little before Athens abandoned its pre-Eucleidean alphabet in favour of Miletus's in 402 BCE, and it may predate that by a century or two. The position of those characters within the numbering system imply that the first two were still in use (or at least remembered as letters) while the third was not. The exact dating, particularly for sampi, is problematic since its uncommon value means the first attested representative near Miletus does not appear until the 2nd century BCE, and its use is unattested in Athens until the 2nd century CE. (In general, Athenians resisted using the new numerals for the longest of any Greek state, but had fully adopted them by c. 50 CE.)

== Description ==
Greek numerals in a c. 1100 Byzantine manuscript of Hero of Alexandria's Metrika. The first line contains the number "͵θ̅ϡ̅ϟ̅ϛ̅ δʹ ϛʹ", i.e. "9,996 + 1/4 + 1/6". It features each of the special numeral symbols sampi (ϡ), koppa (ϟ), and stigma (ϛ) in their minuscule forms.

Greek numerals form a sign-value notation system in decimal. The units from 1 to 9 are assigned to the first nine letters of the old Ionic alphabet from alpha to theta. Instead of reusing these numbers to form multiples of the higher powers of ten, however, each multiple of ten from 10 to 90 was assigned its own separate letter from the next nine letters of the Ionic alphabet from iota to koppa. Each multiple of one hundred from 100 to 900 was then assigned its own separate letter as well, from rho to sampi. Because the Phoenician precursor of sampi fell between what came to represent pi and koppa in Greek, its use to represent 900 is taken as a proof that the sampi had fallen into disuse as a letter by the time the system was created.

This alphabetic system operates on the additive principle in which the numeric values of the letters are added together to obtain the total. For example, 241 was represented as (200 + 40 + 1). (It was not always the case that the numbers ran from highest to lowest: a 4th-century BCE inscription at Athens placed the units to the left of the tens. This practice continued in Asia Minor well into the Roman period.) In ancient and medieval manuscripts, these numerals were eventually distinguished from letters using overbars: α̅, β̅, γ̅, etc. In medieval manuscripts of the Book of Revelation, the number of the Beast 666 is written as χ̅ξ̅ϛ̅ (600 + 60 + 6). (Numbers larger than 1,000 reused the same letters but included various marks to note the change.) Fractions were indicated as the denominator followed by a keraia (ʹ); γʹ indicated one third, δʹ one fourth and so on. As an exception, special symbol ∠ʹ indicated one half, and γ°ʹ or γoʹ was two-thirds. These fractions were additive (also known as Egyptian fractions); for example δʹ ϛʹ indicated 1/4 + 1/6 = 5/12.

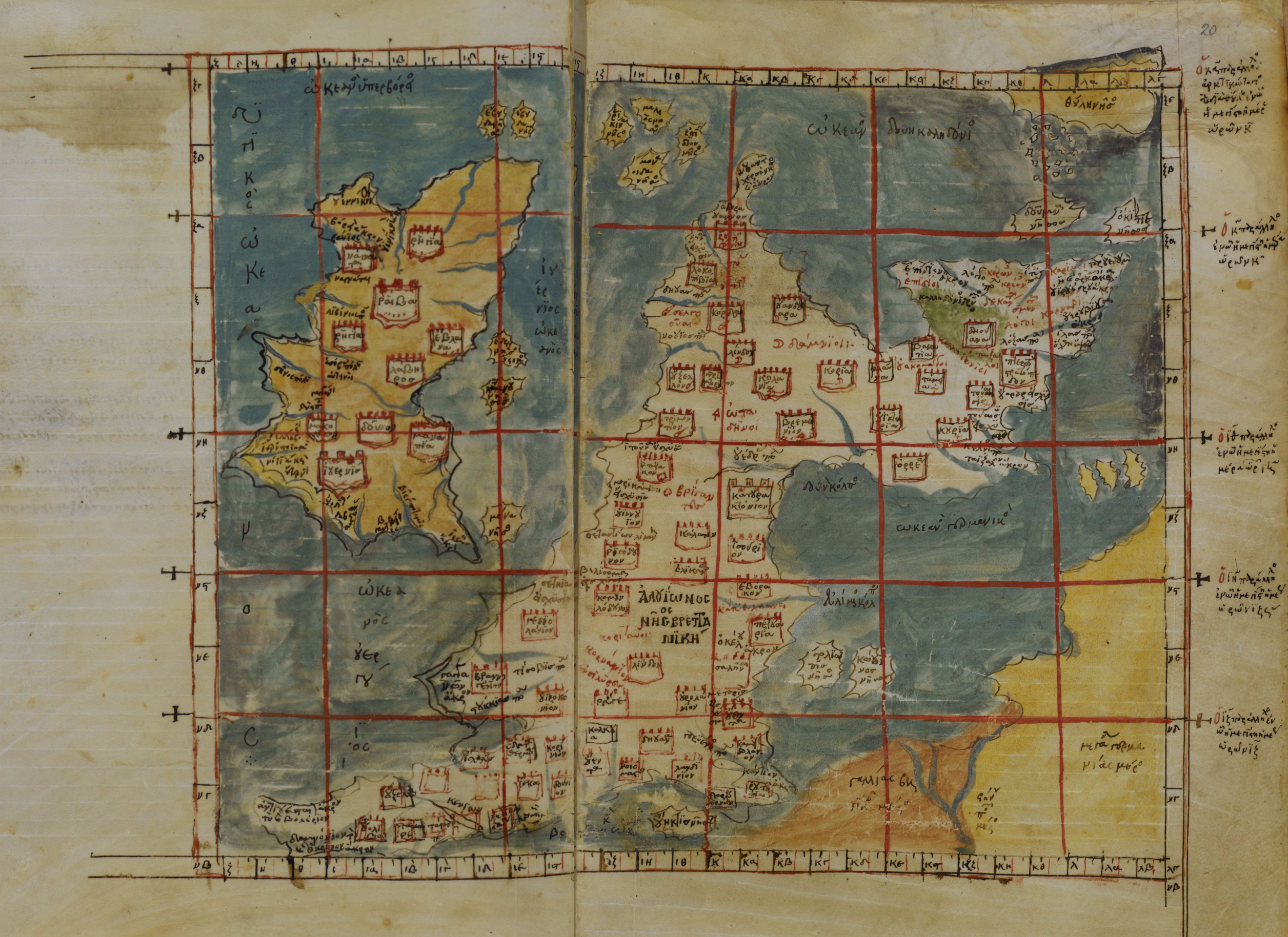
A 14th-century Byzantine map of the British Isles from a manuscript of Ptolemy's Geography, using Greek numerals for its graticule: 52–63°N of the equator and 6–33°E from Ptolemy's Prime Meridian at the Fortunate Isles.

Although the Greek alphabet began with only majuscule forms, surviving papyrus manuscripts from Egypt show that uncial and cursive minuscule forms began early. These new letter forms sometimes replaced the former ones, especially in the case of the obscure numerals. The old Q-shaped koppa (Ϙ) began to be broken up ( and) and simplified ( and). The numeral for 6 changed several times. During antiquity, the original letter form of digamma (Ϝ) came to be avoided in favour of a special numerical one. By the Byzantine era, the letter was known as episemon and written as or. This eventually merged with the sigma-tau ligature stigma ϛ ( or).

In modern Greek, a number of other changes have been made. Instead of extending an over bar over an entire number, the keraia (κεραία, lit. "hornlike projection") is marked to its upper right, a development of the short marks formerly used for single numbers and fractions. The modern keraia (ʹ) is a symbol similar to the acute accent (´), the tonos (U+0384,΄) and the prime symbol (U+02B9, ʹ), but has its own Unicode character as U+0374. Alexander the Great's father Philip II of Macedon is thus known as Φίλιππος Βʹ in modern Greek. A lower left keraia (Unicode: U+0375, "Greek Lower Numeral Sign") is now standard for distinguishing thousands: 2019 is represented as ͵ΒΙΘʹ (2,000 + 10 + 9).

The declining use of ligatures in the 20th century also means that stigma is frequently written as the separate letters ΣΤʹ, although a single keraia is used for the group.

== Isopsephy ==
The practice of adding up the number values of Greek letters of words, names and phrases, thus connecting the meaning of words, names and phrases with others with equivalent numeric sums, is called isopsephy. Similar practices for the Hebrew and English are called gematria and English Qaballa, respectively.

== Table ==
Historical number forms using Greek letters
Ancient	Byzantine	Modern	Value
	α̅	Αʹ	1
	β̅	Βʹ	2
	γ̅	Γʹ	3
	δ̅	Δʹ	4
	ε̅	Εʹ	5
	and and	Ϛʹ; ΣΤʹ	6
	ζ̅	Ζʹ	7
	η̅	Ηʹ	8
	θ̅	Θʹ	9
	ι̅	Ιʹ	10
	κ̅	Κʹ	20
	λ̅	Λʹ	30
	μ̅	Μʹ	40
	ν̅	Νʹ	50
	ξ̅	Ξʹ	60
	ο̅	Οʹ	70
	π̅	Πʹ	80
	and and	Ϟʹ	90
	ρ̅	Ρʹ	100
	σ̅	Σʹ	200
	τ̅	Τʹ	300
	υ̅	Υʹ	400
	φ̅	Φʹ	500
	χ̅	Χʹ	600
	ψ̅	Ψʹ	700
	ω̅	Ωʹ	800
and and	and and and	Ϡʹ	900
and	͵α	͵Α	1000
	͵β	͵Β	2000
	͵γ	͵Γ	3000
	͵δ	͵Δ	4000
	͵ε	͵Ε	5000
	͵ and ͵ ͵ and ͵	͵Ϛ ͵ΣΤ	6000
	͵ζ	͵Ζ	7000
	͵η	͵Η	8000
	͵θ	͵Θ	9000

- Sub-sections of Greek manuscripts are sometimes numbered by lowercase characters (αʹ. βʹ. γʹ. δʹ. εʹ. ϛʹ. ζʹ. ηʹ. θʹ.).
- In Ancient Greek, myriad notation is used for multiples of 10,000, for example for 20,000 or ͵δ̅φ̅ξ̅ζ̅ for 1,234,567 (also written on the line as ρ̅κ̅γ̅Μ ͵δ̅φ̅ξ̅ζ̅).

== Higher numbers ==
In his text The Sand Reckoner, Archimedes gives an upper bound of the number of grains of sand required to fill the entire universe, using an estimate of its size current in his time. His essay demonstrated an easily visualized contradiction of the then-held adage that it was impossible to name a quantity "greater than the number of grains of sand on a beach", or in the entire world. In order to do that, he devised a new enumeration scheme with much greater range than any of those shown above.

Pappus of Alexandria reports that Apollonius of Perga developed a simpler system based on powers of the myriad:

was 10,000 = 10^{4}
was (10,000)^{2} = 100,000,000 = 10^{8}
was (10,000)^{3} = 10^{12}

and so on.

== Zero ==
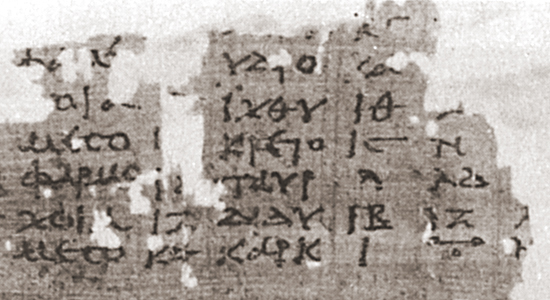
Example of the early Greek symbol for zero (lower right corner) from a 2nd-century papyrus

As a non-positional system, Greek numerals do not have an official representation of the number zero.

Hellenistic astronomers extended alphabetic Greek numerals into a sexagesimal positional numbering system by limiting each position to a maximum value of 50 + 9 which uses only the letters up through nu (ν) and included otherwise unused omicron (ο) as a special symbol for zero. Omicron as zero was only used alone for a whole table cell, rather than combined with other digits, like today's modern zero, which is a placeholder in positional numeric notation. This system was probably adapted from Babylonian numerals by Hipparchus c. 140 BCE. It was then used by Ptolemy (c. 140 BCE), Theon (c. 380 CE) and Theon's daughter Hypatia (d. 415 CE). The symbol omicron or 'ο' as used for zero in astronomical and mathematical data tables is clearly different from its conventional use as the value for 70. In the 2nd century papyrus shown here, one can see the symbol for zero in the lower right, and a number of larger omicrons elsewhere in the same papyrus.

In Ptolemy's table of chords, the first fairly extensive trigonometric table, there were 360 rows, portions of which looked as follows:

$$\begin{array}{ccc} \pi\varepsilon\varrho\iota\varphi\varepsilon\varrho\varepsilon\iota\tilde\omega\nu & \varepsilon\overset{\text{'}}\upsilon\vartheta\varepsilon\iota\tilde\omega\nu & \overset{\text{‘}}\varepsilon\xi\eta\kappa\omicron\sigma\tau\tilde\omega\nu \\
\begin{array}{|l|} \hline \pi\delta\angle' \\  \pi\varepsilon \\  \pi\varepsilon\angle' \\  \hline  \pi\stigma \\  \pi\stigma\angle' \\  \pi\zeta \\  \hline \end{array} & \begin{array}{|r|r|r|} \hline \pi & \mu\alpha & \gamma \\  \pi\alpha & \delta & \iota\varepsilon \\  \pi\alpha & \kappa\zeta & \kappa\beta \\  \hline \pi\alpha & \nu & \kappa\delta \\  \pi\beta & \iota\gamma & \iota\vartheta \\  \pi\beta & \lambda\stigma & \vartheta \\  \hline \end{array} & \begin{array}{|r|r|r|r|} \hline \circ & \circ & \mu\stigma & \kappa\varepsilon \\  \circ & \circ & \mu\stigma & \iota\delta \\  \circ & \circ & \mu\stigma & \gamma \\  \hline \circ & \circ & \mu\varepsilon & \nu\beta \\  \circ & \circ & \mu\varepsilon & \mu \\  \circ & \circ & \mu\varepsilon & \kappa\vartheta \\  \hline \end{array}
\end{array}$$

Each number in the first column, labeled περιφερειῶν, ("regions") is the number of degrees of arc on a circle. Each number in the second column, labeled εὐθειῶν, ("straight lines" or "segments") is the length of the corresponding chord of the circle, when the diameter is 120 units. Thus πδ represents an 84° arc, and the ∠′ after it means one-half, so that πδ∠′ means 84 1/2°. In the next column we see | π | μα | γ | , meaning 80 + 41/60 + 3/60². That is the length of the chord corresponding to an arc of 84 1/2° when the diameter of the circle is 120 units. The next column, labeled ἑξηκοστῶν, for "sixtieths", is the number to be added to the chord length for each 1′ increase in the arc, over the span of the next 1°. Thus that last column was used for linear interpolation.

The Greek sexagesimal placeholder or zero symbol changed over time: The symbol used on papyri during the second century was a very small circle with an overbar several diameters long ( ο̅ ), terminated or not at both ends in various ways. Later, the overbar shortened to only one letter-diameter, similar to the modern 'o'+macron (ō). It was still being used in late medieval Arabic manuscripts whenever alphabetic numerals were used. In later Byzantine manuscripts even the minimal overbar was omitted, leaving a bare 'ο' (omicron). This gradual change from an invented symbol ο̅ to 'ο' does not support the hypothesis that the omicron was the initial of οὐδέν meaning "nothing". Note that the letter 'ο' was still used with its original numerical value of 70; however, there was no ambiguity, as 70 could not appear in the fractional part of a sexagesimal number, and zero was usually omitted when it was the integer.

Some of Ptolemy's true zeros appeared in the first line of each of his eclipse tables, where they were a measure of the angular separation between the center of the Moon and either the center of the Sun (for solar eclipses) or the center of Earth's shadow (for lunar eclipses). All of these zeros took the form ο | ο ο, where Ptolemy actually used three of the symbols described in the previous paragraph. The vertical bar (|) indicates that the integral part on the left was in a separate column labeled in the headings of his tables as digits (of five arc-minutes each), whereas the fractional part was in the next column labeled minute of immersion, meaning sixtieths (and thirty-six-hundredths) of a digit.

The Greek zero was added to Unicode in Version 4.1.0 at U+1018A 𐆊 GREEK ZERO SIGN.

== See also ==
- Alphabetic numeral system – Type of numeral system
- Attic numerals – Symbolic number notation used by the ancient Greeks
- Cyrillic numerals – Numeral system derived from the Cyrillic script
- Greek mathematics – Mathematics of Ancient Greece and the Mediterranean, 5th BC to 6th AD
- Greek numerals in Unicode – Graphemes for various number systems (acrophonic, not alphabetic, numerals)
- Hebrew numerals – Numeral system using letters of the Hebrew alphabet, based on the Greek system
- History of ancient numeral systems
- History of arithmetic – Branch of elementary mathematics
- History of communication
- Isopsephy – Numerological connection between words whose letters' number values have equal sums
- List of numeral system topics
- List of numeral systems
- Number of the beast – Number associated with the Beast of Revelation
- Roman numerals – Numbers in the Roman numeral system
