= Numerical =

Numerical may refer to:

- Number
- Numerical digit
- Numerical analysis
