= List of numeral systems =

There are many different numeral systems, that is, writing systems for expressing numbers.

== By culture / time period ==
"A base is a natural number B whose powers (B multiplied by itself some number of times) are specially designated within a numerical system." The term is not equivalent to radix, as it applies to all numerical notation systems (not just positional ones with a radix) and most systems of spoken numbers. Some systems have two bases, a smaller (subbase) and a larger (base); an example is Roman numerals, which are organized by fives (V=5, L=50, D=500, the subbase) and tens (X=10, C=100, M=1,000, the base).

Name	Base	Sample	Approx. First Appearance
Proto-cuneiform numerals	10&60		c. 3500–2000 BCE
Indus numerals	unknown		c. 3500–1900 BCE
Proto-Elamite numerals	10&60		3100 BCE
Sumerian numerals	10&60		3100 BCE
Egyptian numerals	10	Z1 V20 V1 M12 D50 I8 I7 C11	3000 BCE
Babylonian numerals	10&60		2000 BCE
Aegean numerals	10	𐄇 𐄈 𐄉 𐄊 𐄋 𐄌 𐄍 𐄎 𐄏 ( ) 𐄐 𐄑 𐄒 𐄓 𐄔 𐄕 𐄖 𐄗 𐄘 ( ) 𐄙 𐄚 𐄛 𐄜 𐄝 𐄞 𐄟 𐄠 𐄡 ( ) 𐄢 𐄣 𐄤 𐄥 𐄦 𐄧 𐄨 𐄩 𐄪 ( ) 𐄫 𐄬 𐄭 𐄮 𐄯 𐄰 𐄱 𐄲 𐄳 ( )	1500 BCE
Chinese numerals Japanese numerals Korean numerals (Sino-Korean); Vietnamese numerals (Sino-Vietnamese)	10	零一二三四五六七八九十百千萬億 (Default, Traditional Chinese) 〇一二三四五六七八九十百千万亿 (Default, Simplified Chinese)	1300 BCE
Roman numerals	5&10	I V X L C D M	1000 BCE
Attic numerals	5&10	Ι 𐅃 Δ 𐅄 Η 𐅅 Χ 𐅆 Μ 𐅇	7th century BCE
Greek numerals	10	ō α β γ δ ε ϝ ζ η θ ι ο Αʹ Βʹ Γʹ Δʹ Εʹ Ϛʹ Ζʹ Ηʹ Θʹ	<400 BCE
Kharosthi numerals	4&10	𐩇 𐩆 𐩅 𐩄 𐩃 𐩂 𐩁 𐩀	<400–250 BCE
Maya numerals	5&20	𝋠 𝋡 𝋢 𝋣 𝋤 𝋥 𝋦 𝋧 𝋨 𝋩 𝋪 𝋫 𝋬 𝋭 𝋮 𝋯 𝋰 𝋱 𝋲 𝋳	3rd century BCE
Phoenician numerals	10	𐤙 𐤘 𐤗 𐤛𐤛𐤛 𐤛𐤛𐤚 𐤛𐤛𐤖 𐤛𐤛 𐤛𐤚 𐤛𐤖 𐤛 𐤚 𐤖	<250 BCE
Indian numerals	10	Bengali ০ ১ ২ ৩ ৪ ৫ ৬ ৭ ৮ ৯ Devanagari ० १ २ ३ ४ ५ ६ ७ ८ ९ Gujarati ૦ ૧ ૨ ૩ ૪ ૫ ૬ ૭ ૮ ૯ Kannada ೦ ೧ ೨ ೩ ೪ ೫ ೬ ೭ ೮ ೯ Malayalam ൦ ൧ ൨ ൩ ൪ ൫ ൬ ൭ ൮ ൯ Odia ୦ ୧ ୨ ୩ ୪ ୫ ୬ ୭ ୮ ୯ Punjabi ੦ ੧ ੨ ੩ ੪ ੫ ੬ ੭ ੮ ੯ Tamil ௦ ௧ ௨ ௩ ௪ ௫ ௬ ௭ ௮ ௯ Telugu ౦ ౧ ౨ ౩ ౪ ౫ ౬ ౭ ౮ ౯ Tibetan ༠ ༡ ༢ ༣ ༤ ༥ ༦ ༧ ༨ ༩	3rd century BCE (Brahmi)
Hebrew numerals	10	א ב ג ד ה ו ז ח ט י כ ל מ נ ס ע פ צ ק ר ש ת ך ם ן ף ץ	1st century BCE
Chinese rod numerals	10	𝍠 𝍡 𝍢 𝍣 𝍤 𝍥 𝍦 𝍧 𝍨 𝍩	1st century
Coptic numerals	10	Ⲁ Ⲃ Ⲅ Ⲇ Ⲉ Ⲋ Ⲍ Ⲏ Ⲑ	2nd century
Ge'ez numerals	10	፩ ፪ ፫ ፬ ፭ ፮ ፯ ፰ ፱ ፲ ፳ ፴ ፵ ፶ ፷ ፸ ፹ ፺ ፻ ፼	3rd–4th century 15th century (Modern Style)
Armenian numerals	10	Ա Բ Գ Դ Ե Զ Է Ը Թ Ժ	Early 5th century
Khmer numerals	10	០ ១ ២ ៣ ៤ ៥ ៦ ៧ ៨ ៩	Early 7th century
Thai numerals	10	๐ ๑ ๒ ๓ ๔ ๕ ๖ ๗ ๘ ๙	7th century
Abjad numerals	10	غ ظ ض ذ خ ث ت ش ر ق ص ف ع س ن م ل ك ي ط ح ز و هـ د ج ب ا	<8th century
Chinese numerals (financial)	10	零壹貳參肆伍陸柒捌玖拾佰仟萬億 (T. Chinese) 零壹贰叁肆伍陆柒捌玖拾佰仟萬億 (S. Chinese)	late 7th/early 8th century
Eastern Arabic numerals	10	٩ ٨ ٧ ٦ ٥ ٤ ٣ ٢ ١ ٠ ۹ ۸ ۷ ۶ ۵ ۴ ۳ ۲ ۱ ۰ (Persian)	8th century
Vietnamese numerals (Chữ Nôm)	10	𠬠 𠄩 𠀧 𦊚 𠄼 𦒹 𦉱 𠔭 𠃩	<9th century
Western Arabic numerals	10	0 1 2 3 4 5 6 7 8 9	9th century
Glagolitic numerals	10	Ⰰ Ⰱ Ⰲ Ⰳ Ⰴ Ⰵ Ⰶ Ⰷ Ⰸ ...	9th century
Cyrillic numerals	10	а в г д е ѕ з и ѳ і ...	10th century
Rumi numerals	10		10th century
Burmese numerals	10	၀ ၁ ၂ ၃ ၄ ၅ ၆ ၇ ၈ ၉	11th century
Tangut numerals	10	𘈩 𗍫 𘕕 𗥃 𗏁 𗤁 𗒹 𘉋 𗢭 𗰗	11th century (1036)
Cistercian numerals	10		13th century
Muisca numerals	20		15th century
Korean numerals (Hangul)	10	영 일 이 삼 사 오 육 칠 팔 구	15th century (1443)
Aztec numerals	20	(1, 5, 20, 100, 400, 800, 8000)	16th century
Sinhala numerals	10	෦ ෧ ෨ ෩ ෪ ෫ ෬ ෭ ෮ ෯ 𑇡 𑇢 𑇣 𑇤 𑇥 𑇦 𑇧 𑇨 𑇩 𑇪 𑇫 𑇬 𑇭 𑇮 𑇯 𑇰 𑇱 𑇲 𑇳 𑇴	18th century
Pentadic runes	10		19th century
Cherokee numerals	10		19th century (1820s)
Vai numerals	10	꘠ ꘡ ꘢ ꘣ ꘤ ꘥ ꘦ ꘧ ꘨ ꘩	19th century (1832)
Bamum numerals	10	ꛯ ꛦ ꛧ ꛨ ꛩ ꛪ ꛫ ꛬ ꛭ ꛮ	19th century (1896)
Mende Kikakui numerals	10	𞣏 𞣎 𞣍 𞣌 𞣋 𞣊 𞣉 𞣈 𞣇	20th century (1917)
Osmanya numerals	10	𐒠 𐒡 𐒢 𐒣 𐒤 𐒥 𐒦 𐒧 𐒨 𐒩	20th century (1920s)
Medefaidrin numerals	20	𖺀 𖺁/𖺔 𖺂/𖺕 𖺃/𖺖 𖺄 𖺅 𖺆 𖺇 𖺈 𖺉 𖺊 𖺋 𖺌 𖺍 𖺎 𖺏 𖺐 𖺑 𖺒 𖺓	20th century (1930s)
N'Ko numerals	10	߉ ߈ ߇ ߆ ߅ ߄ ߃ ߂ ߁ ߀	20th century (1949)
Hmong numerals	10	𖭐 𖭑 𖭒 𖭓 𖭔 𖭕 𖭖 𖭗 𖭘 𖭙 𖭑𖭐	20th century (1959)
Garay numerals	10	Garay numbers	20th century (1961)
Adlam numerals	10	𞥙 𞥘 𞥗 𞥖 𞥕 𞥔 𞥓 𞥒 𞥑 𞥐	20th century (1989)
Kaktovik numerals	5&20	𝋀 𝋁 𝋂 𝋃 𝋄 𝋅 𝋆 𝋇 𝋈 𝋉 𝋊 𝋋 𝋌 𝋍 𝋎 𝋏 𝋐 𝋑 𝋒 𝋓	20th century (1994)
Sundanese numerals	10	᮰ ᮱ ᮲ ᮳ ᮴ ᮵ ᮶ ᮷ ᮸ ᮹	20th century (1996)

== By type of notation ==
Numeral systems are classified here as to whether they use positional notation (also known as place-value notation), and further categorized by radix or base.

=== Standard positional numeral systems ===
A binary clock might use LEDs to express binary values. In this clock, each column of LEDs shows a binary-coded decimal numeral of the traditional sexagesimal time.

The common names are derived somewhat arbitrarily from a mix of Latin and Greek, in some cases including roots from both languages within a single name. There have been some proposals for standardisation.

Base	Name	Usage
2	Binary	Digital computing, imperial and customary volume (bushel-kenning-peck-gallon-pottle-quart-pint-cup-gill-jack-fluid ounce-tablespoon).
3	Ternary, trinary	Cantor set (all points in [0,1] that can be represented in ternary with no 1s); counting Tasbih in Islam; hand-foot-yard and teaspoon-tablespoon-shot measurement systems; most economical integer base.
4	Quaternary	Chumashan languages and Kharosthi numerals.
5	Quinary	Aneityum (traditional), Ateso, Gumatj, Kuurn Kopan Noot, and Nunggubuyu, Saraveca languages; common count grouping e.g. tally marks.
6	Senary, seximal	Diceware, Ndom, Kanum, and Proto-Uralic language (suspected).
8	Octal	Charles XII of Sweden, Unix-like permissions, Squawk codes, DEC PDP-11, Yuki, Pame, compact notation for binary numbers, Xiantian (I Ching, China).
9	Nonary, nonal	Compact notation for ternary.
10	Decimal, denary	Most widely used by contemporary societies.
11	Undecimal, unodecimal, undenary	A base-11 number system was mistakenly attributed to the Māori (New Zealand) in the 19th century and one was reported to be used by the Pangwa (Tanzania) in the 20th century, but was not confirmed by later research and is believed to also be an error. Briefly proposed during the French Revolution to settle a dispute between those proposing a shift to duodecimal and those who were content with decimal. Used as a check digit in ISBN for 10-digit ISBNs. Applications in computer science and technology.
12	Duodecimal, dozenal	Languages in the Nigerian Middle Belt Janji, Gbiri-Niragu, Piti, and the Nimbia dialect of Gwandara; Chepang language of Nepal, and the Mahl dialect of Maldivian; dozen-gross-great gross counting; 12-hour clock and months timekeeping; years of Chinese zodiac; foot and inch; Roman fractions.
13	Tredecimal, tridecimal	Conway's base 13 function.
14	Quattuordecimal, quadrodecimal	Programming for the HP 9100A/B calculator and image processing applications.
15	Quindecimal, pentadecimal	Telephony routing over IP, and the Huli language.
16	Hexadecimal, sexadecimal, sedecimal	Compact notation for binary data; tonal system of Nystrom.
17	Heptadecimal, septendecimal	
18	Octodecimal	
19	Undevicesimal, nonadecimal	
20	Vigesimal	Basque, Celtic, Muisca, Inuit, Yoruba, Tlingit, and Dzongkha numerals; Santali, and Ainu languages.
5&20	Quinary-vigesimal	Greenlandic, Iñupiaq, Kaktovik, Maya, Nunivak Cupʼig, and Yupʼik numerals – "wide-spread... in the whole territory from Alaska along the Pacific Coast to the Orinoco and the Amazon."
23		Kalam language,
24	Quadravigesimal	24-hour clock timekeeping; Greek alphabet; Kaugel language.
26	Hexavigesimal	Sometimes used for encryption or ciphering, using all letters in the English alphabet. Used to encode SHA-256 hashes into uppercase letters in InChIKey (a standard indexing system of chemical structures) and SID (sequence identification, an indexing system of PCR amplicons in forensics).
27		Telefol, Oksapmin, Wambon, and Hewa languages. Mapping the nonzero digits to the alphabet and zero to the space is occasionally used to provide checksums for alphabetic data such as personal names, to provide a concise encoding of alphabetic strings, or as the basis for a form of gematria. Compact notation for ternary.
30	Trigesimal	
32	Duotrigesimal	Found in the Ngiti language. Also used to encode computer (binary) data into an alphanumerical string without confusable characters (e.g. zero and "O", eight and "B") in RFC 4648, with each character standing for 5 bits.
36	Hexatrigesimal	Used to encode large numbers into an alphanumeric string (26 letters, 10 numbers).
40		DEC RADIX 50/MOD40 encoding used to compactly represent file names and other symbols on Digital Equipment Corporation computers. The character set is a subset of ASCII consisting of space, upper case letters, the punctuation marks "$", ".", and "%", and the numerals.
50		SQUOZE encoding used to compactly represent file names and other symbols on some IBM computers.
60	Sexagesimal	Babylonian numerals and Sumerian; degrees-minutes-seconds and hours-minutes-seconds measurement systems; Ekari; covers base 62 apart from I, O, and l, but including _(underscore).
64		Used to encode computer (binary) data into a relatively compact string, with each character standing for 6 bits (RFC 4648).
80		Used as a sub-base in Supyire.
90		Related to Goormaghtigh conjecture for the generalized repunit numbers (111 in base 90 = 1111111111111 in base 2).

=== Non-standard positional numeral systems ===
==== Bijective numeration ====
Unary, or bijective base‑1, is used in Tally marks, and Counting. Unary numbering is used as part of some data compression algorithms such as Golomb coding. It also forms the basis for the Peano axioms for formalizing arithmetic within mathematical logic. A form of unary notation called Church encoding is used to represent numbers within lambda calculus. Some email spam filters tag messages with a number of asterisks in an e-mail header such as X-Spam-Bar or X-SPAM-LEVEL. The larger the number, the more likely the email is considered spam.

==== Signed-digit representation ====
Base	Name	Usage
2	Balanced binary (Non-adjacent form)	
3	Balanced ternary	Ternary computers
10	Balanced decimal	John Colson; Augustin Cauchy

==== Complex bases ====
Base	Name	Usage
2i	Quater-imaginary base	related to base −4 and base 16
−1 ± i	Twindragon base	Twindragon fractal shape, related to base −4 and base 16

==== Non-integer bases ====
Base	Name	Usage
φ	Golden ratio base	early Beta encoder
e	Base $e$	best radix economy

==== Mixed radix ====
- Factorial number system {1, 2, 3, 4, 5, 6, ...}
- Primorial number system {2, 3, 5, 7, 11, 13, ...}

==== Other ====
- Quote notation
- Redundant binary representation
- Hereditary base-n notation
- Asymmetric numeral systems optimized for non-uniform probability distribution of symbols
- Combinatorial number system

=== Non-positional notation ===
All known numeral systems developed before the Babylonian numerals are non-positional, as are many developed later, such as the Roman numerals. The French Cistercian monks created their own numeral system.

== See also ==
- History of ancient numeral systems
- History of the Hindu–Arabic numeral system
- List of books on history of number systems
- List of numeral system topics
- Numeral prefix – Prefix derived from numerals or other numbers
- Radix – Number of digits of a numeral system
- Radix economy – Number of digits needed to express a number in a particular base
- Timeline of numerals and arithmetic
