= Positional notation =

Method for representing or encoding numbers

Glossary of terms used in the positional numeral systems

Positional notation, also known as place-value notation, is the property of a numeral system that the value represented by each symbol in a written numeral depends not only on its appearance but also on its position. Each symbol fits in a specific place or position, representing a power of a fixed base. The most common numeral system used today, the Hindu–Arabic numeral system, is a positional system in base ten; each of ten numerical digits is a distinct symbol representing one of the numbers zero through nine, and in the context of the full numeral, each symbol's value is the digit multiplied by a power of ten.

Most early numeral systems, such as Roman numerals, are essentially based on the additive principle: each symbol type represents one fixed value, and the value of a numeral is the sum of the values of the separate symbols. For example, the Roman numeral CCXXVIII has two copies of the symbol C meaning 100, two copies of X meaning 10, one V meaning 5, and three copies of I meaning 1, so overall represents the number 100 + 100 + 10 + 10 + 5 + 1 + 1 + 1 = 228; by comparison, the equivalent Hindu–Arabic numeral, 228, consists of the symbol 2 representing 2 × 100, another symbol 2 representing 2 × 10, and finally an 8 representing 8 × 1.

The Babylonian numeral system, base 60, was the first positional system to be developed, and its influence is present today in the way time and angles are counted in tallies related to 60, such as 60 minutes in an hour and 360 degrees in a circle. The Inca used knots tied in a decimal positional system to store numbers and other values in quipu cords.

The binary numeral system (base two) is used in almost all computers and electronic devices because it is easier to implement efficiently in electronic circuits.

Systems with negative base, complex base or negative digits have been described. Most of them do not require a minus sign for designating negative numbers.

The use of a radix point (decimal point in base ten), extends to include fractions and allows the representation of any real number with arbitrary accuracy. With positional notation, arithmetical computations are much simpler than with any older numeral system; this led to the rapid spread of the notation when it was introduced in western Europe.

== History ==
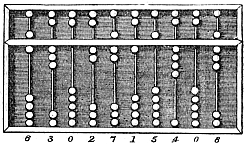
Suanpan (the number represented in the picture is 6,302,715,408)

Today, the base-10 (decimal) system, which is presumably motivated by counting with the ten fingers, is ubiquitous. Other bases have been used in the past, and some continue to be used today. For example, the Babylonian numeral system, credited as the first positional numeral system, was base-60. However, it lacked a real zero. Initially inferred only from context, later, by about 700 BC, zero came to be indicated by a "space" or a "punctuation symbol" (such as two slanted wedges) between numerals. It was a placeholder rather than a true zero because it was not used alone or at the end of a number. Numbers like 2 and 120 (2×60) looked the same because the larger number lacked a final placeholder. Only context could differentiate them.

The polymath Archimedes (ca. 287–212 BC) invented a decimal positional system based on 10^{8} in his Sand Reckoner; 19th century German mathematician Carl Gauss lamented how science might have progressed had Archimedes only made the leap to something akin to the modern decimal system. Hellenistic and Roman astronomers used a base-60 system based on the Babylonian model (see Greek numerals § Zero).

Before positional notation became standard, simple additive systems (sign-value notation) such as Roman numerals or Chinese numerals were used, and accountants in the past used the abacus or stone counters to do arithmetic until the introduction of positional notation.

Chinese rod numerals: Upper row = vertical form Lower row = horizontal form

Counting rods and most abacuses have been used to represent numbers in a positional numeral system. With counting rods or abacus to perform arithmetic operations, the writing of the starting, intermediate and final values of a calculation could easily be done with a simple additive system in each position or column. This approach required no memorization of tables (as does positional notation) and could produce practical results quickly.

The oldest extant positional notation system is either that of Chinese rod numerals, used from at least the early 8th century, or perhaps Khmer numerals, showing possible usages of positional-numbers in the 7th century. Khmer numerals and other Indian numerals originate with the Brahmi numerals of about the 3rd century BC, which symbols were, at the time, not used positionally. Medieval Indian numerals are positional, as are the derived Arabic numerals, recorded from the 10th century.

After the French Revolution (1789–1799), the new French government promoted the extension of the decimal system. Some of those pro-decimal efforts—such as decimal time and the decimal calendar—were unsuccessful. Other French pro-decimal efforts—currency decimalisation and the metrication of weights and measures—spread widely out of France to almost the whole world.

=== History of positional fractions ===
Decimal fractions were first developed and used by the Chinese in the form of rod calculus in the 1st century BC, and then spread to the rest of the world. J. Lennart Berggren notes that positional decimal fractions were being used in Damascus by mathematician Abu'l-Hasan al-Uqlidisi in the mid 10th century. The Jewish mathematician Immanuel Bonfils used decimal fractions around 1350, but did not develop any notation to represent them. The Persian mathematician Jamshīd al-Kāshī similarly adopted their use in the 15th century. Al Khwarizmi introduced fractions to Islamic countries in the early 9th century; his fraction presentation was similar to the traditional Chinese mathematical fractions from Sunzi Suanjing. This form of fraction with numerator on top and denominator at bottom without a horizontal bar was also used by 10th century Abu'l-Hasan al-Uqlidisi and 15th century Jamshīd al-Kāshī's work "Arithmetic Key".

| Number | 184.54290 |
| Simon Stevin's notation | 184⓪5①4②2③9④0 |

The adoption of the decimal representation of numbers less than one, a fraction, is often credited to Simon Stevin through his textbook De Thiende; but both Stevin and E. J. Dijksterhuis indicate that Regiomontanus contributed to the European adoption of general decimals:

European mathematicians, when taking over from the Hindus, via the Arabs, the idea of positional value for integers, neglected to extend this idea to fractions. For some centuries they confined themselves to using common and sexagesimal fractions ... This half-heartedness has never been completely overcome, and sexagesimal fractions still form the basis of our trigonometry, astronomy and measurement of time.

... Mathematicians sought to avoid fractions by taking the radius R equal to a number of units of length of the form 10^{n} and then assuming for n so great an integral value that all occurring quantities could be expressed with sufficient accuracy by integers.

The first to apply this method was the German astronomer Regiomontanus. To the extent that he expressed goniometrical line-segments in a unit R/10^{n}, Regiomontanus may be called an anticipator of the doctrine of decimal positional fractions.

In the estimation of Dijksterhuis, "after the publication of De Thiende only a small advance was required to establish the complete system of decimal positional fractions, and this step was taken promptly by a number of writers ... next to Stevin the most important figure in this development was Regiomontanus." Dijksterhuis noted that [Stevin] "gives full credit to Regiomontanus for his prior contribution, saying that the trigonometric tables of the German astronomer actually contain the whole theory of 'numbers of the tenth progress'."

== Mathematics ==
=== Base of the numeral system ===
In mathematical numeral systems the radix r is usually the number of unique digits, including zero, that a positional numeral system uses to represent numbers. In some cases, such as with a negative base, the radix is the absolute value $r=|b|$ of the base b. For example, for the decimal system the radix (and base) is ten, because it uses the ten digits from 0 through 9. When a number "hits" 9, the next number will not be another different symbol, but a "1" followed by a "0". In binary, the radix is two, since after it hits "1", instead of "2" or another written symbol, it jumps straight to "10", followed by "11" and "100".

The highest symbol of a positional numeral system usually has the value one less than the value of the radix of that numeral system. The standard positional numeral systems differ from one another only in the base they use.

The radix is an integer that is greater than 1, since a radix of zero would not have any digits, and a radix of 1 would only have the zero digit. Negative bases are rarely used. In a system with more than $|b|$ unique digits, numbers may have many different possible representations.

It is important that the radix is finite, from which follows that the number of digits is quite low. Otherwise, the length of a numeral would not necessarily be logarithmic in its size.

(In certain non-standard positional numeral systems, including bijective numeration, the definition of the base or the allowed digits deviates from the above.)

In standard base-ten (decimal) positional notation, there are ten decimal digits and the number

$$5305_{\mathrm{dec}} = (5 \times 10^3) + (3 \times 10^2) + (0 \times 10^1) + (5 \times 10^0)$$.

In standard base-sixteen (hexadecimal), there are the sixteen hexadecimal digits (0–9 and A–F) and the number

$$14\mathrm{B}9_{\mathrm{hex}} = (1 \times 16^3) + (4 \times 16^2) + (\mathrm{B} \times 16^1) + (9 \times 16^0) \qquad (= 5305_{\mathrm{dec}}) ,$$

where B represents the number eleven as a single symbol.

In general, in base-b, there are b digits $\{d_1,d_2,\dotsb,d_b\} =:D$ and the number

$$(a_3 a_2 a_1 a_0)_b = (a_3 \times b^3) + (a_2 \times b^2) + (a_1 \times b^1) + (a_0 \times b^0)$$

has $\forall k \colon a_k \in D .$ Note that $a_3 a_2 a_1 a_0$ represents a sequence of digits, not multiplication.

=== Notation ===
When describing base in mathematical notation, the letter b is generally used as a symbol for this concept, so, for a binary system, b equals 2. Another common way of expressing the base is writing it as a decimal subscript after the number that is being represented (this notation is used in this article). 1111011_{2} implies that the number 1111011 is a base-2 number, equal to 123_{10} (a decimal notation representation), 173_{8} (octal) and 7B_{16} (hexadecimal). In books and articles, when using initially the written abbreviations of number bases, the base is not subsequently printed: it is assumed that binary 1111011 is the same as 1111011_{2}.

The base b may also be indicated by the phrase "base-b". So binary numbers are "base-2"; octal numbers are "base-8"; decimal numbers are "base-10"; and so on.

To a given radix b the set of digits {0, 1, ..., b−2, b−1} is called the standard set of digits. Thus, binary numbers have digits {0, 1}; decimal numbers have digits {0, 1, 2, ..., 8, 9}; and so on. Therefore, the following are notational errors: 52_{2}, 2_{2}, 1A_{9}. (In all cases, one or more digits is not in the set of allowed digits for the given base.)

=== Exponentiation ===
Positional numeral systems work using exponentiation of the base. A digit's value is the digit multiplied by the value of its place. Place values are the number of the base raised to the nth power, where n is the number of other digits between a given digit and the radix point. If a given digit is on the left hand side of the radix point (i.e. its value is an integer) then n is positive or zero; if the digit is on the right hand side of the radix point (i.e., its value is fractional) then n is negative.

As an example of usage, the number 465 in its respective base b (which must be at least base 7 because the highest digit in it is 6) is equal to:

$$4\times b^2 + 6\times b^1 + 5\times b^0$$

If the number 465 was in base-10, then it would equal:

$$465_{10} = 4\times 10^2 + 6\times 10^1 + 5\times 10^0 = 4\times 100 + 6\times 10 + 5\times 1 = 465_{10}$$

If however, the number were in base 7, then it would equal:

$$465_{7} = 4\times 7^2 + 6\times 7^1 + 5\times 7^0 = 4\times 49 + 6\times 7 + 5\times 1 = 243_{10}$$

10_{b} = b for any base b, since 10_{b} = 1×b^{1} + 0×b^{0}. For example, 10_{2} = 2; 10_{3} = 3; 10_{16} = 16_{10}. Note that the last "16" is indicated to be in base 10. The base makes no difference for one-digit numerals.

This concept can be demonstrated using a diagram. One object represents one unit. When the number of objects is equal to or greater than the base b, then a group of objects is created with b objects. When the number of these groups exceeds b, then a group of these groups of objects is created with b groups of b objects; and so on. Thus the same number in different bases will have different values:

241 in base 5:
   2 groups of 52 (25)           4 groups of 5          1 group of 1
   ooooo    ooooo
   ooooo    ooooo                ooooo   ooooo
   ooooo    ooooo         +                         +         o
   ooooo    ooooo                ooooo   ooooo
   ooooo    ooooo

241 in base 8:
   2 groups of 82 (64)          4 groups of 8          1 group of 1
 oooooooo  oooooooo
 oooooooo  oooooooo
 oooooooo  oooooooo         oooooooo   oooooooo
 oooooooo  oooooooo    +                            +        o
 oooooooo  oooooooo
 oooooooo  oooooooo         oooooooo   oooooooo
 oooooooo  oooooooo
 oooooooo  oooooooo

The notation can be further augmented by allowing a leading minus sign. This allows the representation of negative numbers. For a given base, every representation corresponds to exactly one real number and every real number has at least one representation. The representations of rational numbers are those representations that are finite, use the bar notation, or end with an infinitely repeating cycle of digits.

=== Digits and numerals ===
A digit is a symbol that is used for positional notation, and a numeral consists of one or more digits used for representing a number with positional notation. Today's most common digits are the decimal digits "0", "1", "2", "3", "4", "5", "6", "7", "8", and "9". The distinction between a digit and a numeral is most pronounced in the context of a number base.

A non-zero numeral with more than one digit position will mean a different number in a different number base, but in general, the digits will mean the same. For example, the base-8 numeral 23_{8} contains two digits, "2" and "3", and with a base number (subscripted) "8". When converted to base-10, the 23_{8} is equivalent to 19_{10}, i.e. 23_{8} = 19_{10}. In our notation here, the subscript "_{8}" of the numeral 23_{8} is part of the numeral, but this may not always be the case.

Imagine the numeral "23" as having an ambiguous base number. Then "23" could likely be any base, from base-4 up. In base-4, the "23" means 11_{10}, i.e. 23_{4} = 11_{10}. In base-60, the "23" means the number 123_{10}, i.e. 23_{60} = 123_{10}. The numeral "23" then, in this case, corresponds to the set of base-10 numbers {11, 13, 15, 17, 19, 21, 23, ..., 121, 123} while its digits "2" and "3" always retain their original meaning: the "2" means "two of", and the "3" means "three of".

In certain applications when a numeral with a fixed number of positions needs to represent a greater number, a higher number-base with more digits per position can be used. A three-digit, decimal numeral can represent only up to 999. But if the number-base is increased to 11, say, by adding the digit "A", then the same three positions, maximized to "AAA", can represent a number as great as 1330. We could increase the number base again and assign "B" to 11, and so on (but there is also a possible encryption between number and digit in the number-digit-numeral hierarchy). A three-digit numeral "ZZZ" in base-60 could mean 215999. If we use the entire collection of our alphanumerics we could ultimately serve a base-62 numeral system, but we remove two digits, uppercase "I" and uppercase "O", to reduce confusion with digits "1" and "0". We are left with a base-60, or sexagesimal numeral system utilizing 60 of the 62 standard alphanumerics. (But see Sexagesimal system below.) In general, the number of possible values that can be represented by a $d$ digit number in base $r$ is $r^d$.

The common numeral systems in computer science are binary (radix 2), octal (radix 8), and hexadecimal (radix 16). In binary only digits "0" and "1" are in the numerals. In the octal numerals, are the eight digits 0–7. Hex is 0–9 A–F, where the ten numerics retain their usual meaning, and the alphabetics correspond to values 10–15, for a total of sixteen digits. The numeral "10" is binary numeral "2", octal numeral "8", or hexadecimal numeral "16".

=== Radix point ===
The notation can be extended into the negative exponents of the base b. Thereby the so-called radix point, mostly ».«, is used as separator of the positions with non-negative from those with negative exponent.

Numbers that are not integers use places beyond the radix point. For every position behind this point (and thus after the units digit), the exponent n of the power b^{n} decreases by 1 and the power approaches 0. For example, the number 2.35 is equal to:

$$2\times 10^0 + 3\times 10^{-1} + 5\times 10^{-2}$$

=== Sign ===
If the base and all the digits in the set of digits are non-negative, negative numbers cannot be expressed. To overcome this, a minus sign, here −, is added to the numeral system. In the usual notation it is prepended to the string of digits representing the otherwise non-negative number.

=== Base conversion ===
The conversion to a base $b_2$ of an integer n represented in base $b_1$ can be done by a succession of Euclidean divisions by $b_2:$ the right-most digit in base $b_2$ is the remainder of the division of n by $b_2;$ the second right-most digit is the remainder of the division of the quotient by $b_2,$ and so on. The left-most digit is the last quotient. In general, the kth digit from the right is the remainder of the division by $b_2$ of the (k−1)th quotient.

For example: converting A10B_{Hex} to decimal (41227):

0xA10B/10 = Q: 0x101A, R: 7 (ones place)
0x101A/10 = Q: 0x19C,  R: 2 (tens place)
 0x19C/10 = Q: 0x29,   R: 2 (hundreds place)
  0x29/10 = Q: 0x4,    R: 1  ...
                         4

When converting to a larger base (such as from binary to decimal), the remainder represents $b_2$ as a single digit, using digits from $b_1$. For example: converting 0b11111001 (binary) to 249 (decimal):

0b11111001/10 = Q: 0b11000, R: 0b1001 (0b1001 = "9" for ones place)
   0b11000/10 = Q: 0b10,    R: 0b100  (0b100 =  "4" for tens)
      0b10/10 = Q: 0b0,     R: 0b10   (0b10 =   "2" for hundreds)

For the fractional part, conversion can be done by taking digits after the radix point (the numerator), and dividing it by the implied denominator in the target radix. Approximation may be needed due to a possibility of non-terminating digits if the reduced fraction's denominator has a prime factor other than any of the base's prime factor(s) to convert to. For example, 0.1 in decimal (1/10) is 0b1/0b1010 in binary, by dividing this in that radix, the result is 0b0.00̅0̅1̅1̅ (because one of the prime factors of 10 is 5). For more general fractions and bases see the algorithm for positive bases.

Alternatively, Horner's method can be used for base conversion using repeated multiplications, with the same computational complexity as repeated divisions. A number in positional notation can be thought of as a polynomial, where each digit is a coefficient. Coefficients can be larger than one digit, so an efficient way to convert bases is to convert each digit, then evaluate the polynomial via Horner's method within the target base. Converting each digit is a simple lookup table, removing the need for expensive division or modulus operations; and multiplication by x becomes right-shifting. However, other polynomial evaluation algorithms would work as well, like repeated squaring for single or sparse digits. Example:

Convert 0xA10B to 41227
 A10B = (10*16^3) + (1*16^2) + (0*16^1) + (11*16^0)

 Lookup table:
  0x0 = 0
  0x1 = 1
  ...
  0x9 = 9
  0xA = 10
  0xB = 11
  0xC = 12
  0xD = 13
  0xE = 14
  0xF = 15
 Therefore 0xA10B's decimal digits are 10, 1, 0, and 11.

 Lay out the digits out like this. The most significant digit (10) is "dropped":
  10 1   0    11 <- Digits of 0xA10B

  ---------------
  10
 Then we multiply the bottom number from the source base (16), the product is placed under the next digit of the source value, and then add:
  10 1   0    11
     160
  ---------------
  10 161

 Repeat until the final addition is performed:
  10 1   0    11
     160 2576 41216
  ---------------
  10 161 2576 41227

 and that is 41227 in decimal.

Convert 0b11111001 to 249
 Lookup table:
  0b0 = 0
  0b1 = 1

Result:
 1  1  1  1  1  0  0   1 <- Digits of 0b11111001
    2  6  14 30 62 124 248
 -------------------------
 1  3  7  15 31 62 124 249

=== Terminating fractions ===
The numbers which have a finite representation form the semiring

$$\frac{\N_0}{b^{\N_0}} := \left\{mb^{-\nu}\mid m\in \N_0 \wedge \nu\in \N_0 \right\} .$$

More explicitly, if $p_1^{\nu_1} \cdot \ldots \cdot p_n^{\nu_n} := b$ is a factorization of $b$ into the primes $p_1, \ldots ,p_n \in \mathbb P$ with exponents $\nu_1, \ldots ,\nu_n \in \N$, then with the non-empty set of denominators $S := \{ p_1, \ldots, p_n \}$ we have

$$\Z_S := \left\{x \in \Q \left | \, \exists \mu_i \in \Z : x \prod_{i=1}^n {p_i}^{\mu_i} \in \Z \right . \right\} = b^{\Z} \, \Z = {\langle S\rangle}^{-1}\Z$$

where $\langle S\rangle$ is the group generated by the $p\in S$ and ${\langle S\rangle}^{-1}\Z$ is the so-called localization of $\Z$ with respect to $S$.

The denominator of an element of $\Z_S$ contains if reduced to lowest terms only prime factors out of $S$. This ring of all terminating fractions to base $b$ is dense in the field of rational numbers $\Q$. Its completion for the usual (Archimedean) metric is the same as for $\Q$, namely the real numbers $\R$. So, if $S = \{ p\}$ then $\Z_{\{ p\}}$ has not to be confused with $\Z_{(p)}$, the discrete valuation ring for the prime $p$, which is equal to $\Z_{T}$ with $T = \mathbb P \setminus \{ p\}$.

If $b$ divides $c$, we have $b^{\Z} \, \Z \subseteq c^{\Z} \, \Z.$

=== Infinite representations ===
==== Rational numbers ====
The representation of non-integers can be extended to allow an infinite string of digits beyond the point. For example, 1.12112111211112 ... base-3 represents the sum of the infinite series:

$$\begin{array}{l}
1\times 3^{0\,\,\,} + {}\\
1\times 3^{-1\,\,} + 2\times 3^{-2\,\,\,} + {}\\
1\times 3^{-3\,\,} + 1\times 3^{-4\,\,\,} + 2\times 3^{-5\,\,\,} + {}\\
1\times 3^{-6\,\,} + 1\times 3^{-7\,\,\,} + 1\times 3^{-8\,\,\,} + 2\times 3^{-9\,\,\,} + {}\\
1\times 3^{-10} + 1\times 3^{-11} + 1\times 3^{-12} + 1\times 3^{-13} + 2\times 3^{-14} + \cdots
\end{array}$$

Since a complete infinite string of digits cannot be explicitly written, the trailing ellipsis (...) designates the omitted digits, which may or may not follow a pattern of some kind. One common pattern is when a finite sequence of digits repeats infinitely. This is designated by drawing a vinculum across the repeating block:

$$2.42\overline{314}_5 = 2.42314314314314314\dots_5$$

This is the repeating decimal notation (to which there does not exist a single universally accepted notation or phrasing). For base 10 it is called a repeating decimal or recurring decimal.

An irrational number has an infinite non-repeating representation in all integer bases. Whether a rational number has a finite representation or requires an infinite repeating representation depends on the base. For example, one third can be represented by:

$$0.1_3$$
$0.\overline3_{10} = 0.3333333\dots_{10}$

or, with the base implied:
$0.\overline3 = 0.3333333\dots$ (see also 0.999...)

$$0.\overline{01}_2 = 0.010101\dots_2$$
$$0.2_6$$

For integers p and q with gcd (p, q) = 1, the fraction p/q has a finite representation in base b if and only if each prime factor of q is also a prime factor of b.

For a given base, any number that can be represented by a finite number of digits (without using the bar notation) will have multiple representations, including one or two infinite representations:

1. A finite or infinite number of zeroes can be appended:
  $$3.46_7 = 3.460_7 = 3.460000_7 = 3.46\overline0_7$$
2. The last non-zero digit can be reduced by one and an infinite string of digits, each corresponding to one less than the base, are appended (or replace any following zero digits):
  $$3.46_7 = 3.45\overline6_7$$
  $1_{10} = 0.\overline9_{10}\qquad$ (see also 0.999...)
  $$220_5 = 214.\overline4_5$$

==== Irrational numbers ====
A (real) irrational number has an infinite non-repeating representation in all integer bases.

Examples are the non-solvable nth roots

$$y = \sqrt[n]{x}$$

with $y^n = x$ and y ∉ Q, numbers which are called algebraic, or numbers like

$$\pi,e$$

which are transcendental. The number of transcendentals is uncountable and the sole way to write them down with a finite number of symbols is to give them a symbol or a finite sequence of symbols.

== Applications ==
=== Decimal system ===
In the decimal (base-10) Hindu–Arabic numeral system, each position starting from the right is a higher power of 10. The first position represents 10^{0} (1), the second position 10^{1} (10), the third position 10^{2} (10 × 10 or 100), the fourth position 10^{3} (10 × 10 × 10 or 1000), and so on.

Fractional values are indicated by a separator, which can vary in different locations. Usually this separator is a period or full stop, or a comma. Digits to the right of it are multiplied by 10 raised to a negative power or exponent. The first position to the right of the separator indicates 10^{−1} (0.1), the second position 10^{−2} (0.01), and so on for each successive position.

As an example, the number 2674 in a base-10 numeral system is:

(2 × 10^{3}) + (6 × 10^{2}) + (7 × 10^{1}) + (4 × 10^{0})

or

(2 × 1000) + (6 × 100) + (7 × 10) + (4 × 1).

=== Sexagesimal system ===
The sexagesimal or base-60 system was used for the integral and fractional portions of Babylonian numerals and other Mesopotamian systems, by Hellenistic astronomers using Greek numerals for the fractional portion only, and is still used for modern time and angles, but only for minutes and seconds. However, not all of these uses were positional.

Modern time separates each position by a colon or a prime symbol. For example, the time might be 10:25:59 (10 hours 25 minutes 59 seconds). Angles use similar notation. For example, an angle might be 10°25′59″ (10 degrees 25 minutes 59 seconds). In both cases, only minutes and seconds use sexagesimal notation—angular degrees can be larger than 59 (one rotation around a circle is 360°, two rotations are 720°, etc.), and both time and angles use decimal fractions of a second. This contrasts with the numbers used by Hellenistic and Renaissance astronomers, who used thirds, fourths, etc. for finer increments. Where we might write 10°25′59.392″, they would have written 10°25′59′′23′′′31′′′′12′′′′′ or 10°25^{i}59^{ii}23^{iii}31^{iv}12^{v}.

Using a digit set of digits with upper and lowercase letters allows short notation for sexagesimal numbers, e.g. 10:25:59 becomes 'ARz' (by omitting I and O, but not i and o), which is useful for use in URLs, etc., but it is not very intelligible to humans.

In the 1930s, Otto Neugebauer introduced a modern notational system for Babylonian and Hellenistic numbers that substitutes modern decimal notation from 0 to 59 in each position, while using a semicolon (;) to separate the integral and fractional portions of the number and using a comma (,) to separate the positions within each portion. For example, the mean synodic month used by both Babylonian and Hellenistic astronomers and still used in the Hebrew calendar is 29;31,50,8,20 days, and the angle used in the example above would be written 10;25,59,23,31,12 degrees.

=== Computing ===
In computing, the binary (base-2), octal (base-8) and hexadecimal (base-16) bases are most commonly used. Computers, at the most basic level, deal only with sequences of conventional zeroes and ones, thus it is easier in this sense to deal with powers of two. The hexadecimal system is used as "shorthand" for binary—every 4 binary digits (bits) relate to one and only one hexadecimal digit. In hexadecimal, the six digits after 9 are denoted by A, B, C, D, E, and F (and sometimes a, b, c, d, e, and f).

The octal numbering system is also used as another way to represent binary numbers. In this case the base is 8 and therefore only digits 0, 1, 2, 3, 4, 5, 6, and 7 are used. When converting from binary to octal every 3 bits relate to one and only one octal digit.

Hexadecimal, decimal, octal, and a wide variety of other bases have been used for binary-to-text encoding, implementations of arbitrary-precision arithmetic, and other applications.

For a list of bases and their applications, see list of numeral systems.

=== Other bases in human language ===
Base-12 systems (duodecimal or dozenal) have been popular because multiplication and division are easier than in base-10, with addition and subtraction being just as easy. Twelve is a useful base because it has many factors. It is the smallest common multiple of one, two, three, four and six. There is still a special word for "dozen" in English, and by analogy with the word for 10^{2}, hundred, commerce developed a word for 12^{2}, gross. The standard 12-hour clock and common use of 12 in English units emphasize the utility of the base. In addition, prior to its conversion to decimal, the old British currency Pound Sterling (GBP) partially used base-12; there were 12 pence (d) in a shilling (s), 20 shillings in a pound (£), and therefore 240 pence in a pound. Hence the term LSD or, more properly, £sd.

The Maya civilization and other civilizations of pre-Columbian Mesoamerica used base-20 (vigesimal), as did several North American tribes (two being in southern California). Evidence of base-20 counting systems is also found in the languages of central and western Africa.

Remnants of a Gaulish base-20 system also exist in French, as seen today in the names of the numbers from 60 through 99. For example, sixty-five is soixante-cinq (literally, "sixty [and] five"), while seventy-five is soixante-quinze (literally, "sixty [and] fifteen"). Furthermore, for any number between 80 and 99, the "tens-column" number is expressed as a multiple of twenty. For example, eighty-two is quatre-vingt-deux (literally, four twenty[s] [and] two), while ninety-two is quatre-vingt-douze (literally, four twenty[s] [and] twelve). In Old French, forty was expressed as two twenties and sixty was three twenties, so that fifty-three was expressed as two twenties [and] thirteen, and so on.

In English the same base-20 counting appears in the use of "scores". Although mostly historical, it is occasionally used colloquially. Verse 10 of Psalm 90 in the King James Version of the Bible starts: "The days of our years are threescore years and ten; and if by reason of strength they be fourscore years, yet is their strength labour and sorrow". The Gettysburg Address starts: "Four score and seven years ago".

The Irish language also used base-20 in the past, twenty being fichid, forty dhá fhichid, sixty trí fhichid and eighty ceithre fhichid. A remnant of this system may be seen in the modern word for 40, daoichead.

The Welsh language continues to use a base-20 counting system, particularly for the age of people, dates and in common phrases. 15 is also important, with 16–19 being "one on 15", "two on 15" etc. 18 is normally "two nines". A decimal system is commonly used.

The Inuit languages use a base-20 counting system. Students from Kaktovik, Alaska invented a base-20 numeral system in 1994

Danish numerals display a similar base-20 structure.

The Māori language of New Zealand also has evidence of an underlying base-20 system as seen in the terms Te Hokowhitu a Tu referring to a war party (literally "the seven 20s of Tu") and Tama-hokotahi, referring to a great warrior ("the one man equal to 20").

The binary system was used in the Egyptian Old Kingdom, 3000 BC to 2050 BC. It was cursive by rounding off rational numbers smaller than 1 to 1/2 + 1/4 + 1/8 + 1/16 + 1/32 + 1/64, with a 1/64 term thrown away (the system was called the Eye of Horus).

A number of Australian Aboriginal languages employ binary or binary-like counting systems. For example, in Kala Lagaw Ya, the numbers one through six are urapon, ukasar, ukasar-urapon, ukasar-ukasar, ukasar-ukasar-urapon, ukasar-ukasar-ukasar.

North and Central American natives used base-4 (quaternary) to represent the four cardinal directions. Mesoamericans tended to add a second base-5 system to create a modified base-20 system.

A base-5 system (quinary) has been used in many cultures for counting. Plainly it is based on the number of digits on a human hand. It may also be regarded as a sub-base of other bases, such as base-10, base-20, and base-60.

A base-8 system (octal) was devised by the Yuki tribe of Northern California, who used the spaces between the fingers to count, corresponding to the digits one through eight. There is also linguistic evidence which suggests that the Bronze Age Proto-Indo Europeans (from whom most European and Indic languages descend) might have replaced a base-8 system (or a system which could only count up to 8) with a base-10 system. The evidence is that the word for 9, newm, is suggested by some to derive from the word for "new", newo-, suggesting that the number 9 had been recently invented and called the "new number".

Many ancient counting systems use five as a primary base, almost surely coming from the number of fingers on a person's hand. Often these systems are supplemented with a secondary base, sometimes ten, sometimes twenty. In some African languages the word for five is the same as "hand" or "fist" (Dyola language of Guinea-Bissau, Banda language of Central Africa). Counting continues by adding 1, 2, 3, or 4 to combinations of 5, until the secondary base is reached. In the case of twenty, this word often means "man complete". This system is referred to as quinquavigesimal. It is found in many languages of the Sudan region.

The Telefol language, spoken in Papua New Guinea, is notable for possessing a base-27 numeral system.

== Non-standard positional numeral systems ==
Interesting properties exist when the base is not fixed or positive and when the digit symbol sets denote negative values. There are many more variations. These systems are of practical and theoretic value to computer scientists.

Balanced ternary uses a base of 3 but the digit set is {1̅,0,1} instead of {0,1,2}. The "1̅" has an equivalent value of −1. The negation of a number is easily formed by switching the on the 1s. This system can be used to solve the balance problem, which requires finding a minimal set of known counter-weights to determine an unknown weight. Weights of 1, 3, 9, ..., 3^{n} known units can be used to determine any unknown weight up to 1 + 3 + ... + 3^{n} units. A weight can be used on either side of the balance or not at all. Weights used on the balance pan with the unknown weight are designated with 1̅, with 1 if used on the empty pan, and with 0 if not used. If an unknown weight W is balanced with 3 (3^{1}) on its pan and 1 and 27 (3^{0} and 3^{3}) on the other, then its weight in decimal is 25 or 101̅1 in balanced base-3.

101̅1_{3} = 1 × 3^{3} + 0 × 3^{2} − 1 × 3^{1} + 1 × 3^{0} = 25.

The factorial number system uses a varying radix, giving factorials as place values; they are related to Chinese remainder theorem and residue number system enumerations. This system effectively enumerates permutations. A derivative of this uses the Towers of Hanoi puzzle configuration as a counting system. The configuration of the towers can be put into 1-to-1 correspondence with the decimal count of the step at which the configuration occurs and vice versa.

| Decimal equivalents | −3 | −2 | −1 | 0 | 1 | 2 | 3 | 4 | 5 | 6 | 7 | 8 |
| Balanced base 3 | 1̅0 | 1̅1 | 1̅ | 0 | 1 | 11̅ | 10 | 11 | 11̅1̅ | 11̅0 | 11̅1 | 101̅ |
| Base −2 | 1101 | 10 | 11 | 0 | 1 | 110 | 111 | 100 | 101 | 11010 | 11011 | 11000 |
| Factoroid | −110 | −100 | −10 | 0 | 10 | 100 | 110 | 200 | 210 | 1000 | 1010 | 1100 |

== Non-positional positions ==
Each position does not need to be positional itself. Babylonian sexagesimal numerals were positional, but in each position were groups of two kinds of wedges representing ones and tens (a narrow vertical wedge | for the one and an open left pointing wedge ⟨ for the ten) — up to 5+9=14 symbols per position (i.e. 5 tens ⟨⟨⟨⟨⟨ and 9 ones ||||||||| grouped into one or two near squares containing up to three tiers of symbols, or a place holder (⑊) for the lack of a position). Hellenistic astronomers used one or two alphabetic Greek numerals for each position (one chosen from 5 letters representing 10–50 and/or one chosen from 9 letters representing 1–9, or a zero symbol).

== See also ==
Examples:

- List of numeral systems
- Category: Positional numeral systems

Related topics:

- Algorism
- Hindu–Arabic numeral system
- Mixed radix
- Non-standard positional numeral systems
- Scientific notation

Other:

- Significant figures
