= De Thiende =

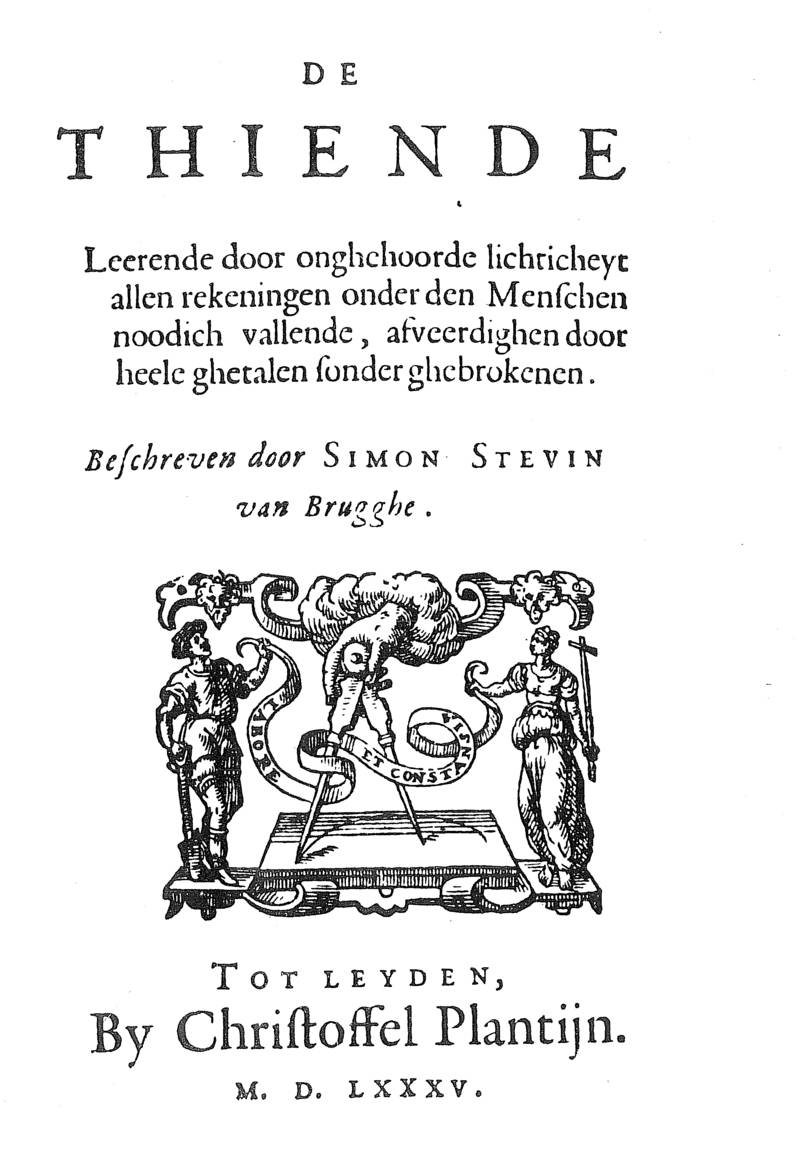
- Author: Simon Stevin
- Genre: Mathematics
- Publication date: 1585

De Thiende, published in 1585 in the Dutch language by Simon Stevin, is remembered for extending positional notation to the use of decimals to represent fractions. A French version, La Disme, was issued the same year by Stevin.

Stevin introduced the decimal separator ⓪ between integer and fractional parts of a decimal number, calling it the "commencement". His notation included superfluous symbols ① after or above the tenths place, ② after or above the hundredths, and so on. Stevin also produced a French language version, and according to Sarton, "As the Flemish and French texts were both written by the author, edited by him, and published at almost the same time in the same printing shop, they have practically the same standing as original sources of STEVIN’s thought."

== Decimal fractions ==
According to George Sarton, "The Thiende was the earliest treatise deliberately devoted to the study of decimal fractions, and STEVIN's account is the earliest account of them. Hence, even if decimal fractions were used previously by other men, it was STEVIN – and no other – who introduced them into the mathematical domain. That important extension of the idea of number – the creation of the decimal number – was undoubtedly a fruit of his genius, and its occurrence can be very exactly dated – 1585."

The Princeton Companion to Mathematics provides the following estimation of Stevin's contribution to positional notation:

"The Flemish mathematician and engineer Simon Stevin is remembered for his study of decimal fractions. Although he was not the first to use decimal fractions (they are found in the work of the tenth-century Islamic mathematician al-Uqlidisi), it was his tract De Thiende (“The tenth”), published in 1585 and translated into English as Disme: The Art of Tenths, or Decimall Arithmetike Teaching (1608), that led to their widespread adoption in Europe. Stevin, however, did not use the notation we use today. He drew circles around the exponents of the powers of one tenth: thus he wrote 7.3486 as 7⓪ 3① 4② 8③ 6④. In De Thiende Stevin not only demonstrated how decimal fractions could be used but also advocated that a decimal system should be used for weights and measures and for coinage."

== Importance ==
The importance of Stevin's book De Thiende was expressed in The Princeton Companion to Mathematics:

The idea of extending the decimal place-value system to include fractions was discovered by several mathematicians. The most influential of these was Simon Stevin, a Flemish mathematician and engineer who popularized the system in a booklet called De Thiende ("The tenth"), first published in 1585. By extending place value to tenths, hundredths, and so on, Stevin created the system we still use today. More importantly, he explained how it simplified calculations that involved fractions, and gave many practical applications. The cover page, in fact, announces that the book is for astrologers, surveyors, measurers of tapestries.

On the dedication, Sarton wrote, "The dedication 'To astrologers, landmeasurers, measurers of tapestry and wine casks, and steriometricians in general, mint-masters and merchants all, SIMON STEVIN, greetings' has such a queer ring that I wonder whether the author did not make it with his tongue in his cheek."

Although Stevin is credited with introduction of decimal fractions in Europe through this book, there were predecessors: In particular, the book al-Fusul (952) by Abu'l-Hasan al-Uqlidisi exhibited decimal fractions as well as a decimal separator.
