= Vietnamese numerals =

Numbering system of the Vietnamese language

Historically Vietnamese has two sets of numbers: one is etymologically native Vietnamese; the other uses Sino-Vietnamese vocabulary. In the modern language the native Vietnamese vocabulary is used for both everyday counting and mathematical purposes. The Sino-Vietnamese vocabulary is used only in fixed expressions or in Sino-Vietnamese words, in a similar way that Latin and Greek numerals are used in modern English (e.g., the bi- prefix in bicycle).

For numbers up to one million, native Vietnamese terms are often used the most, whilst mixed Sino-Vietnamese origin words and native Vietnamese words are used for units of one million or above.

== Concept ==
For non-official purposes prior to the 20th century, Vietnamese had a writing system known as Hán-Nôm. Sino-Vietnamese numbers were written in chữ Hán and native vocabulary was written in chữ Nôm. Hence, there are two concurrent systems in Vietnamese nowadays in the romanized script, one for native Vietnamese and one for Sino-Vietnamese.

In the modern Vietnamese writing system, numbers are written as Arabic numerals or in the romanized script chữ Quốc ngữ (một, hai, ba), which had a chữ Nôm character. Less common for numbers under one million are the numbers of Sino-Vietnamese origin (nhất [1], nhị [2], tam [3]), using chữ Hán (Chinese characters). Chữ Hán and chữ Nôm has all but become obsolete in the Vietnamese language, with the Latin-style of reading, writing, and pronouncing native Vietnamese and Sino-Vietnamese being widespread instead, when France occupied Vietnam. Chữ Hán can still be seen in traditional temples or traditional literature or in cultural artefacts. The Hán-Nôm Institute resides in Hanoi, Vietnam.

== Basic figures ==
The following table is an overview of the basic Vietnamese numeric figures, provided in both native and Sino-Vietnamese counting systems. The form that is highlighted in green is the most widely used for all purposes whilst the ones highlighted in blue are seen as archaic but may still be in use. There are slight differences between the Hanoi and Saigon dialects of Vietnamese, readings between each are differentiated below.

Number	Native Vietnamese		Sino-Vietnamese		Notes
Number	chữ Quốc ngữ	chữ Nôm	chữ Quốc ngữ	chữ Hán	Notes
0	không	空	linh	空 • 零	The foreign-language borrowed word zêrô (zêro, dê-rô) is often used in physics-related publications, or colloquially.
1	một	𠬠	nhất	一（壹）	
2	hai	𠄩	nhị	二（貳）	
3	ba	𠀧	tam	三（叄）	
4	bốn	𦊚	tứ	四（肆）	In the ordinal number system, the Sino-Vietnamese tư (四) is more systematic; as the digit 4 appears after the number 20 when counting upwards, the Sino-Vietnamese tư (四) is more commonly used. However, in colloquial speech, the native Vietnamese bốn (𦊚) may be used more frequently instead.
5	năm	𠄼	ngũ	五（伍）	In numbers above ten that end in five (such as 115, 25, 1055), five is alternatively pronounced as lăm (𠄻) to avoid possible confusion with năm (𢆥), a homonym of năm, meaning "year". Exceptions to this rule are numbers ending in 05 (such as 605, 9405).
6	sáu	𦒹	lục	六（陸）	
7	bảy	𦉱	thất	七（柒）	In some Vietnamese dialects, it is also read as bẩy.
8	tám	𠔭	bát	八（捌）	
9	chín	𠃩	cửu	九（玖）	
10	mười • một chục	𨒒 • 𠬠𠦹	thập	十（拾）	Chục is used colloquially. "Ten eggs" may be called một chục quả trứng rather than mười quả trứng. It is also used in compounds like mươi instead of mười (e.g. hai mươi/chục "twenty").
100	trăm • một trăm	𤾓 • 𠬠𤾓	bách (bá)	百（佰）	The Sino-Vietnamese bách (百) is commonly used as a morpheme (in compound words), and is rarely used in the field of mathematics as a digit. Example: bách phát bách trúng (百發百中).
1,000	nghìn (ngàn) • một nghìn (ngàn)	𠦳 • 𠬠𠦳	thiên	千（仟）	The Sino-Vietnamese thiên (千) is commonly used as a morpheme, but rarely used in a mathematical sense, however only in counting bricks, it is used. Example: thiên kim (千金). Nghìn is the standard word in Northern Vietnam, whilst ngàn is the word used in the South.
10,000	mười nghìn (ngàn)	𨒒𠦳	vạn • một vạn	萬 • 𠬠萬	The một (𠬠) within một vạn (𠬠萬) is a native Vietnamese (intrinsic term) morpheme. This was officially used in Vietnamese in the past, however, this unit has become less common after 1945, but in counting bricks, it is still widely used. The borrowed native pronunciation muôn for 萬 is still used in slogans such as muôn năm (ten thousand years/endless). There is also the obsolete variant of muôn, man.
100,000	trăm nghìn (ngàn) • một trăm nghìn (ngàn)	𤾓𠦳 • 𠬠𤾓𠦳	ức • một ức • mười vạn	億 • 𠬠億 • 𨒒萬	The mười (𨒒) and một (𠬠) within mười vạn (𨒒萬) and một ức (𠬠億) are native Vietnamese (intrinsic term) morphemes. Vẹo (表) is an obsolete Vietnamese word meaning 100,000.
1,000,000	(none)	(none)	triệu • một triệu • một trăm vạn	兆 • 𠬠兆 • 𠬠𤾓萬	The một (𠬠) and trăm (𤾓) within một triệu (𠬠兆) and một trăm vạn (𠬠𤾓萬) are native Vietnamese (intrinsic term) morphemes.
10,000,000	(mixed usage of Sino-Vietnamese and native Vietnamese systems)	(mixed usage of Sino-Vietnamese and native Vietnamese systems)	mười triệu	𨒒兆	The mười (𨒒) within mười triệu (𨒒兆) is a native Vietnamese (intrinsic term) morpheme.
100,000,000	(mixed usage of Sino-Vietnamese and native Vietnamese systems)	(mixed usage of Sino-Vietnamese and native Vietnamese systems)	trăm triệu	𤾓兆	The trăm (𤾓) within trăm triệu (𤾓兆) is a native Vietnamese (intrinsic term) morpheme.
1,000,000,000	(none)	(none)	tỷ	秭	
10^{12}	(mixed usage of Sino-Vietnamese and native Vietnamese systems)	(mixed usage of Sino-Vietnamese and native Vietnamese systems)	nghìn (ngàn) tỷ	𠦳秭	
10^{15}	(none)	(none)	triệu tỷ	兆秭	
10^{18}	(none)	(none)	tỷ tỷ	秭秭	

Some other features of Vietnamese numerals include the following:

- Outside of fixed Sino-Vietnamese expressions, Sino-Vietnamese words are usually used in combination with native Vietnamese words. For instance, mười triệu combines native mười and Sino-Vietnamese triệu.
- Modern Vietnamese separates place values in thousands instead of myriads. For example, "123123123" is recorded in Vietnamese as một trăm hai mươi ba triệu một trăm hai mươi ba nghìn (ngàn) một trăm hai mươi ba, or 123 million, 123 thousand and 123. Meanwhile, in Chinese, Japanese & Korean, the same number is rendered as 1億2312萬3123 (1 hundred-million, 2312 ten-thousand and 3123).
  - Modern Vietnamese uses comma as decimal separator when written in Arabic numerals.
- Sino-Vietnamese numbers are not in frequent use in modern Vietnamese. Sino-Vietnamese numbers such as vạn (萬) 'ten thousand', ức (億) 'hundred-thousand' and triệu (兆) 'million' are used for figures exceeding one thousand, but with the exception of triệu are becoming less commonly used. Number values for these words are used for each numeral increasing tenfold in digit value, 億 being the number for 10^{5}, 兆 for 10^{6}, et cetera. However, triệu in Vietnamese and 兆 in Modern Chinese now have different values, except for Mainland China, where 兆 is the same-valued SI prefix mega- (10^{6}).

== Other figures ==
Number	chữ Quốc ngữ	Hán-Nôm	Notes
11	mười một	𨒒𠬠	
12	mười hai • một tá	𨒒𠄩 • 𠬠打	Một tá (𠬠打) is often used within mathematics-related occasions, to which tá represents the foreign loanword "dozen".
14	mười bốn • mười tư	𨒒𦊚 • 𨒒四	Mười tư (𨒒四) is often used within literature-related occasions, to which tư (四) forms part of the Sino-Vietnamese vocabulary.
15	mười lăm	𨒒𠄻	Here, five is pronounced lăm (𠄻), or also nhăm (𠄶) by some speakers in the north.
19	mười chín	𨒒𠃩	
20	hai mươi • hai chục	𠄩𨒒 • 𠄩𨔿	
21	hai mươi mốt	𠄩𨒒𠬠	For numbers which include the digit 1 from 21 to 91, the number 1 is pronounced mốt.
24	hai mươi tư	𠄩𨒒四	When the digit 4 appears in numbers after 20 as the last digit of a 3-digit group, it is more common to use tư (四).
25	hai mươi lăm	𠄩𨒒𠄻	Here, five is pronounced lăm.
50	năm mươi • năm chục	𠄼𨒒 • 𠄼𨔿	When 𨒒 (10) appears after the number 20, the pronunciation changes to mươi.
101	một trăm linh một • một trăm lẻ một	𠬠𤾓零𠬠 • 𠬠𤾓𥘶𠬠	Một trăm linh một (𠬠𤾓零𠬠) is the Northern form, where linh (零) forms part of the Sino-Vietnamese vocabulary; một trăm lẻ một (𠬠𤾓𥘶𠬠) is commonly used in the Southern and Central dialect groups of Vietnam.
1001	một nghìn (ngàn) không trăm linh một • một nghìn (ngàn) không trăm lẻ một	𠬠𠦳空𤾓零𠬠 • 𠬠𠦳空𤾓𥛭𠬠	When the hundreds digit is occupied by a zero, these are expressed using không trăm (空𤾓).
10055	mười nghìn (ngàn) không trăm năm mươi lăm	𨒒𠦳空𤾓𠄼𨒒𠄻	

- When the number 1 appears after 20 in the unit digit, the pronunciation changes to mốt.
- When the number 4 appears after 20 in the unit digit, it is more common to use Sino-Vietnamese tư (四/𦊛).
- When the number 5 appears after 10 in the unit digit, the pronunciation changes to lăm (𠄻), or in some Northern dialects, nhăm (𠄶) .
- When mười appears after 20, the pronunciation changes to mươi.

== Ordinal numbers ==
Vietnamese ordinal numbers are generally preceded by the prefix thứ-, which is a Sino-Vietnamese word which corresponds to 次. For the ordinal numbers of one and four, the Sino-Vietnamese readings nhất (一) and tư (四/𦊛) are more commonly used; two is occasionally rendered using the Sino-Vietnamese nhì (二). In all other cases, the native Vietnamese number is used.

In formal cases, the ordinal number with the structure "đệ (第) + Sino-Vietnamese numbers" is used, especially in calling the generation of monarches, with an example being Nữ vương Elizabeth đệ nhị (女王 Elizabeth 第二) (Queen Elizabeth II), or the Second Spanish Republic being called Đệ nhị Cộng hoà Tây Ban Nha (第二共和西班牙).

Ordinal number	chữ Quốc ngữ	Hán-Nôm
1st	thứ nhất	次一
2nd	thứ hai • thứ nhì	次𠄩 • 次二
3rd	thứ ba	次𠀧
4th	thứ tư	次四
5th	thứ năm	次𠄼
"n"th	thứ "n"	次「n」

== See also ==
- Japanese numerals
- Korean numerals
- Chinese numerals
