= Aegean numerals =

Numeral system used by the Minoans and Mycenaeans

Aegean numerals are an additive sign-value numeral system that was used by the Minoan and Mycenaean civilizations. They are attested in the Linear A and Linear B scripts. They may have also survived in the Cypro-Minoan script, where a single sign with the value "100" is attested on a large clay tablet from Enkomi.

Aegean numerals
1	2	3	4	5	6	7	8	9
𐄇	𐄈	𐄉	𐄊	𐄋	𐄌	𐄍	𐄎	𐄏
1	2	3	4	5	6	7	8	9
10	20	30	40	50	60	70	80	90
𐄐	𐄑	𐄒	𐄓	𐄔	𐄕	𐄖	𐄗	𐄘
10	20	30	40	50	60	70	80	90
100	200	300	400	500	600	700	800	900
𐄙	𐄚	𐄛	𐄜	𐄝	𐄞	𐄟	𐄠	𐄡
100	200	300	400	500	600	700	800	900
1,000	2,000	3,000	4,000	5,000	6,000	7,000	8,000	9,000
𐄢	𐄣	𐄤	𐄥	𐄦	𐄧	𐄨	𐄩	𐄪
1000	2000	3000	4000	5000	6000	7000	8000	9000
10,000	20,000	30,000	40,000	50,000	60,000	70,000	80,000	90,000
𐄫	𐄬	𐄭	𐄮	𐄯	𐄰	𐄱	𐄲	𐄳
10000	20000	30000	40000	50000	60000	70000	80000	90000

== Unicode ==
Aegean Numbers^{[1]}^{[2]} Official Unicode Consortium code chart (PDF)
	0	1	2	3	4	5	6	7	8	9	A	B	C	D	E	F
U+1010x	𐄀	𐄁	𐄂					𐄇	𐄈	𐄉	𐄊	𐄋	𐄌	𐄍	𐄎	𐄏
U+1011x	𐄐	𐄑	𐄒	𐄓	𐄔	𐄕	𐄖	𐄗	𐄘	𐄙	𐄚	𐄛	𐄜	𐄝	𐄞	𐄟
U+1012x	𐄠	𐄡	𐄢	𐄣	𐄤	𐄥	𐄦	𐄧	𐄨	𐄩	𐄪	𐄫	𐄬	𐄭	𐄮	𐄯
U+1013x	𐄰	𐄱	𐄲	𐄳				𐄷	𐄸	𐄹	𐄺	𐄻	𐄼	𐄽	𐄾	𐄿
Notes 1.As of Unicode version 18.0 2.Grey areas indicate non-assigned code points

== See also ==
- Greek numerals
