= Babylonian cuneiform numerals =

Numeral system

Babylonian cuneiform numerals

The numeral system of the Babylonians, also used in Assyria and Chaldea, was written in cuneiform using a wedge-tipped reed stylus to print a mark on a soft clay tablet, which would be exposed in the sun to harden to create a permanent record.

The Babylonians were famous for their astronomical observations, as well as their calculations (aided by their invention of the abacus), and used a sexagesimal (base-60) number system inherited from either the Sumerian or the Akkadian civilizations. The Babylonian system, however, was positional (having a convention for which "end" of the numeral represented the units).

== Origins ==
This system first appeared around 2000 BC; its structure reflects the decimal lexical numerals of Semitic languages rather than Sumerian lexical numbers. However, the use of a special Sumerian sign for 60 (beside two Semitic signs for the same number) attests to a relation with the Sumerian system.

== Symbols ==
The Babylonian system is credited as being the first known positional numeral system, in which the value of a particular digit depends both on the digit itself and its position within the number. This was an extremely important development because non-place-value systems require unique symbols to represent each power of a base (ten, one hundred, one thousand, and so forth), which can make calculations more difficult.

Only two symbols (𒁹 to count units and 𒌋 to count tens) were used to notate the 59 non-zero digits. These symbols and their values were combined to form a digit in a sign-value notation quite similar to that of Roman numerals; for example, the combination 𒌋𒌋𒁹𒁹𒁹 represented the digit for 23 (see table of digits above).

These digits were used to represent larger numbers in the base 60 (sexagesimal) positional system. For example, 𒁹𒁹 𒌋𒌋𒁹𒁹𒁹 𒁹𒁹𒁹 would represent 2×60^{2}+23×60+3 = 8583.

A space was left to indicate a place without value, similar to the modern-day zero. Babylonians later devised a sign to represent this empty place. They lacked a symbol to serve the function of radix point, so the place of the units had to be inferred from context: 𒌋𒌋𒁹𒁹𒁹 could have represented 23, 23×60 (𒌋𒌋𒁹𒁹𒁹␣), 23×60×60 (𒌋𒌋𒁹𒁹𒁹␣␣), or 23/60, etc.

Their system clearly used internal decimal to represent digits, but it was not really a mixed-radix system of bases 10 and 6, since the ten sub-base was used merely to facilitate the representation of the large set of digits needed, while the place-values in a digit string were consistently 60-based and the arithmetic needed to work with these digit strings was correspondingly sexagesimal.

The legacy of sexagesimal still survives to this day, in the form of degrees (360° in a circle or 60° in an angle of an equilateral triangle), arcminutes, and arcseconds in trigonometry and the measurement of time, although both of these systems are actually mixed radix.

A common theory is that 60, a superior highly composite number (the previous and next in the series being 12 and 120), was chosen due to its prime factorization: 2×2×3×5, which makes it divisible by 1, 2, 3, 4, 5, 6, 10, 12, 15, 20, 30, and 60. Integers and fractions were represented identically—a radix point was not written but rather made clear by context.

=== Zero ===
The Babylonians did not technically have a digit for, nor a concept of, the number zero. Although they understood the idea of nothingness, it was not seen as a number—merely the lack of a number. Later Babylonian texts used a placeholder to represent zero, but only in the medial positions, and not on the right-hand side of the number, as is done in numbers like 100.

== See also ==
- Akkadian language § Numerals
- Babylon
- Babylonia
- Babylonian mathematics
- Cuneiform (Unicode block)
- History of zero
- Numeral system
- Sumerian language § Numerals
