= Radix =

Number of digits of a numeral system

In a positional numeral system, the radix (pl. radices) or base is the number of unique digits, including the digit zero, used to represent numbers. For example, in decimal systems (the most common systems in use today) the radix is ten.

In any standard positional numeral system, a number is conventionally written as (x)_{y} with x as the string of digits and y as its base. For base ten, the subscript is usually assumed and omitted (together with the enclosing parentheses), as it is the most common way to express value. For example, (100)_{10} is equivalent to 100 (the decimal system is implied in the latter) and represents the number one hundred, while (100)_{2} (in the binary system with base 2) represents the number four.

Electronic computers process and store information in the simplest way, as bits of binary code, which have a radix of 2.

== Etymology ==
Radix is a Latin word for "root". Root can be considered a synonym for base, in the arithmetical sense.

== In numeral systems ==
Generally, in a system with radix b (b > 1), a string of digits d_{1} ... d_{n} denotes the number d_{1}b^{n−1} + d_{2}b^{n−2} + ... + d_{n}b^{0}, where 0 ≤ d_{i} < b. In contrast to decimal, or radix 10, which has a ones' place, tens' place, hundreds' place, and so on, radix b would have a ones' place, then a b^{1}s' place, a b^{2}s' place, etc.

For example, if b = 12, a string of digits such as 59A (where the letter "A" represents the value of ten) would represent the value 5 × 12^{2} + 9 × 12^{1} + 10 × 12^{0} = 838 in base 10.

Commonly used numeral systems include:

Base/radix	Name	Description
2	Binary numeral system	Used internally by nearly all computers. The two digits are "0" and "1", expressed from switches displaying OFF and ON, respectively. Used in most electric counters.
8	Octal system	Used occasionally in computing. The eight digits are "0"–"7" and represent 3 bits (2^{3}).
10	Decimal system	Used by humans in the wide majority of cultures. Its ten digits are "0"–"9". Used in most mechanical counters.
12	Duodecimal (dozenal) system	Sometimes advocated due to divisibility by 2, 3, 4, and 6. It was traditionally used as part of quantities expressed in dozens and grosses.
16	Hexadecimal system	Often used in computing as a more compact representation of binary (1 hex digit per 4 bits). The sixteen digits are "0"–"9" followed by "A"–"F" or "a"–"f".
20	Vigesimal system	Traditional numeral system in several cultures, still used by some for counting. Historically also known as the score system in English, now most famous in the phrase "four score and seven years ago" in the Gettysburg Address.
36	Base36	Base36, or hexatrigesimal is a binary-to-text encoding scheme that represents binary data in an ASCII string format by translating it into a radix-36 representation. The choice of 36 is convenient in that the digits can be represented using the Arabic numerals 0–9 and the Latin letters A–Z (the ISO basic Latin alphabet). Each base36 digit needs less than 6 bits of information to be represented.
60	Sexagesimal system	Originally used in modified form in ancient Sumer and passed to the Babylonians. Used today as the basis of modern circular coordinate system (degrees, minutes, and seconds) and time measuring (minutes, and seconds) by analogy to the rotation of the Earth.

The octal and hexadecimal systems are often used in computing because of their ease as shorthand for binary. Every hexadecimal digit corresponds to a sequence of four binary digits, since sixteen is the fourth power of two; for example, hexadecimal 78_{16} is binary 1111000_{2}. Similarly, every octal digit corresponds to a unique sequence of three binary digits, since eight is the cube of two.

This representation is unique. Let b be a positive integer greater than 1. Then every positive integer a can be expressed uniquely in the form

$$a = r_m b^m + r_{m-1} b^{m-1} + \dotsb + r_1 b + r_0,$$

where m is a nonnegative integer and the r's are integers such that

0 < r_{m} < b and 0 ≤ r_{i} < b for i = 0, 1, ... , m − 1.

Radices are usually natural numbers. However, other positional systems are possible, for example, golden ratio base (whose radix is a non-integer algebraic number), and negative base (whose radix is negative). A negative base allows the representation of negative numbers without the use of a minus sign. For example, let b = −10. Then a string of digits such as 19 denotes the (decimal) number 1 × (−10)^{1} + 9 × (−10)^{0} = −1.

== Table of bases ==
Different bases are especially used in connection with computers. The commonly used bases are 10 (decimal), 2 (binary), 8 (octal), and 16 (hexadecimal). A byte with 8 bits can represent values from 0 to 255, often expressed with leading zeros in base 2, 8 or 16 to give the same length.

The first row in the tables is the base written in decimal.

0–15
10	2	8	16
0	00000000	000	00
1	00000001	001	01
2	00000010	002	02
3	00000011	003	03
4	00000100	004	04
5	00000101	005	05
6	00000110	006	06
7	00000111	007	07
8	00001000	010	08
9	00001001	011	09
10	00001010	012	0a
11	00001011	013	0b
12	00001100	014	0c
13	00001101	015	0d
14	00001110	016	0e
15	00001111	017	0f

16–31
10	2	8	16
16	00010000	020	10
17	00010001	021	11
18	00010010	022	12
19	00010011	023	13
20	00010100	024	14
21	00010101	025	15
22	00010110	026	16
23	00010111	027	17
24	00011000	030	18
25	00011001	031	19
26	00011010	032	1a
27	00011011	033	1b
28	00011100	034	1c
29	00011101	035	1d
30	00011110	036	1e
31	00011111	037	1f

32–47
10	2	8	16
32	00100000	040	20
33	00100001	041	21
34	00100010	042	22
35	00100011	043	23
36	00100100	044	24
37	00100101	045	25
38	00100110	046	26
39	00100111	047	27
40	00101000	050	28
41	00101001	051	29
42	00101010	052	2a
43	00101011	053	2b
44	00101100	054	2c
45	00101101	055	2d
46	00101110	056	2e
47	00101111	057	2f

48–63
10	2	8	16
48	00110000	060	30
49	00110001	061	31
50	00110010	062	32
51	00110011	063	33
52	00110100	064	34
53	00110101	065	35
54	00110110	066	36
55	00110111	067	37
56	00111000	070	38
57	00111001	071	39
58	00111010	072	3a
59	00111011	073	3b
60	00111100	074	3c
61	00111101	075	3d
62	00111110	076	3e
63	00111111	077	3f

64–79
10	2	8	16
64	01000000	100	40
65	01000001	101	41
66	01000010	102	42
67	01000011	103	43
68	01000100	104	44
69	01000101	105	45
70	01000110	106	46
71	01000111	107	47
72	01001000	110	48
73	01001001	111	49
74	01001010	112	4a
75	01001011	113	4b
76	01001100	114	4c
77	01001101	115	4d
78	01001110	116	4e
79	01001111	117	4f

80–95
10	2	8	16
80	01010000	120	50
81	01010001	121	51
82	01010010	122	52
83	01010011	123	53
84	01010100	124	54
85	01010101	125	55
86	01010110	126	56
87	01010111	127	57
88	01011000	130	58
89	01011001	131	59
90	01011010	132	5a
91	01011011	133	5b
92	01011100	134	5c
93	01011101	135	5d
94	01011110	136	5e
95	01011111	137	5f

96–111
10	2	8	16
96	01100000	140	60
97	01100001	141	61
98	01100010	142	62
99	01100011	143	63
100	01100100	144	64
101	01100101	145	65
102	01100110	146	66
103	01100111	147	67
104	01101000	150	68
105	01101001	151	69
106	01101010	152	6a
107	01101011	153	6b
108	01101100	154	6c
109	01101101	155	6d
110	01101110	156	6e
111	01101111	157	6f

112–127
10	2	8	16
112	01110000	160	70
113	01110001	161	71
114	01110010	162	72
115	01110011	163	73
116	01110100	164	74
117	01110101	165	75
118	01110110	166	76
119	01110111	167	77
120	01111000	170	78
121	01111001	171	79
122	01111010	172	7a
123	01111011	173	7b
124	01111100	174	7c
125	01111101	175	7d
126	01111110	176	7e
127	01111111	177	7f

128–143
10	2	8	16
128	10000000	200	80
129	10000001	201	81
130	10000010	202	82
131	10000011	203	83
132	10000100	204	84
133	10000101	205	85
134	10000110	206	86
135	10000111	207	87
136	10001000	210	88
137	10001001	211	89
138	10001010	212	8a
139	10001011	213	8b
140	10001100	214	8c
141	10001101	215	8d
142	10001110	216	8e
143	10001111	217	8f

144–159
10	2	8	16
144	10010000	220	90
145	10010001	221	91
146	10010010	222	92
147	10010011	223	93
148	10010100	224	94
149	10010101	225	95
150	10010110	226	96
151	10010111	227	97
152	10011000	230	98
153	10011001	231	99
154	10011010	232	9a
155	10011011	233	9b
156	10011100	234	9c
157	10011101	235	9d
158	10011110	236	9e
159	10011111	237	9f

160–175
10	2	8	16
160	10100000	240	a0
161	10100001	241	a1
162	10100010	242	a2
163	10100011	243	a3
164	10100100	244	a4
165	10100101	245	a5
166	10100110	246	a6
167	10100111	247	a7
168	10101000	250	a8
169	10101001	251	a9
170	10101010	252	aa
171	10101011	253	ab
172	10101100	254	ac
173	10101101	255	ad
174	10101110	256	ae
175	10101111	257	af

176–191
10	2	8	16
176	10110000	260	b0
177	10110001	261	b1
178	10110010	262	b2
179	10110011	263	b3
180	10110100	264	b4
181	10110101	265	b5
182	10110110	266	b6
183	10110111	267	b7
184	10111000	270	b8
185	10111001	271	b9
186	10111010	272	ba
187	10111011	273	bb
188	10111100	274	bc
189	10111101	275	bd
190	10111110	276	be
191	10111111	277	bf

192–207
10	2	8	16
192	11000000	300	c0
193	11000001	301	c1
194	11000010	302	c2
195	11000011	303	c3
196	11000100	304	c4
197	11000101	305	c5
198	11000110	306	c6
199	11000111	307	c7
200	11001000	310	c8
201	11001001	311	c9
202	11001010	312	ca
203	11001011	313	cb
204	11001100	314	cc
205	11001101	315	cd
206	11001110	316	ce
207	11001111	317	cf

208–223
10	2	8	16
208	11010000	320	d0
209	11010001	321	d1
210	11010010	322	d2
211	11010011	323	d3
212	11010100	324	d4
213	11010101	325	d5
214	11010110	326	d6
215	11010111	327	d7
216	11011000	330	d8
217	11011001	331	d9
218	11011010	332	da
219	11011011	333	db
220	11011100	334	dc
221	11011101	335	dd
222	11011110	336	de
223	11011111	337	df

224–239
10	2	8	16
224	11100000	340	e0
225	11100001	341	e1
226	11100010	342	e2
227	11100011	343	e3
228	11100100	344	e4
229	11100101	345	e5
230	11100110	346	e6
231	11100111	347	e7
232	11101000	350	e8
233	11101001	351	e9
234	11101010	352	ea
235	11101011	353	eb
236	11101100	354	ec
237	11101101	355	ed
238	11101110	356	ee
239	11101111	357	ef

240–255
10	2	8	16
240	11110000	360	f0
241	11110001	361	f1
242	11110010	362	f2
243	11110011	363	f3
244	11110100	364	f4
245	11110101	365	f5
246	11110110	366	f6
247	11110111	367	f7
248	11111000	370	f8
249	11111001	371	f9
250	11111010	372	fa
251	11111011	373	fb
252	11111100	374	fc
253	11111101	375	fd
254	11111110	376	fe
255	11111111	377	ff

== See also ==
- Floating-point arithmetic
- Mixed radix
- Polynomial
- Radix economy
- Radix sort
- Non-standard positional numeral systems
- List of numeral systems
