= Sign-value notation =

Number representation system

A sign-value notation is a numeral system in which the number or value represented by each symbol or sign does not depend on their position in a sequence. Sequential signs are typically combined in an additive, subtractive, or multiplicative manner to represent larger values by convention.

Although the absolute value of each sign is independent of its position, the value of the resulting sequence as a whole may depend on the order of the signs. This is the case with numeral systems which combine additive and subtractive notation, such as Roman numerals. There is no need for zero in sign-value notation.

== Additive notation ==
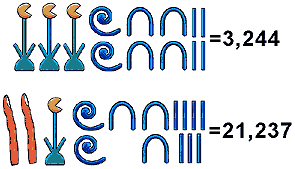
Additive notation in Egyptian numerals.

Additive notation represents numbers by a series of numerals that added together equal the value of the number represented, much as tally marks are added together to represent a larger number. To represent multiples of the sign value, the same sign is simply repeated. In Roman numerals, for example, X means ten and L means fifty, so LXXX means eighty (50 + 10 + 10 + 10).

Although signs may be written in a conventional order the value of each sign does not depend on its place in the sequence, and changing the order does not affect the total value of the sequence in an additive system. Frequently used large numbers are often expressed using unique symbols to avoid excessive repetition. Aztec numerals, for example, use a tally of dots for numbers less than twenty alongside unique symbols for powers of twenty, including 400 and 8,000.

== Subtractive notation ==
Subtractive notation represents numbers by a series of numerals in which signs representing smaller values are typically subtracted from those representing larger values to equal the value of the number represented. In Roman numerals, for example, I means one and X means ten, so IX means nine (10 − 1). The consistent use of the subtractive system with Roman numerals was not standardised until after the widespread adoption of the printing press in Europe.

== History ==
Sign-value notation was the ancient way of writing numbers and only gradually evolved into place-value notation, also known as positional notation. Sign-value notations have been used across the world by a variety of cultures throughout history.

=== Mesopotamia ===
When ancient people wanted to write "two sheep" in clay, they could inscribe in clay a picture of two sheep; however, this would be impractical when they wanted to write "twenty sheep". In Mesopotamia they used small clay tokens to represent a number of a specific commodity, and strung the tokens like beads on a string, which were used for accounting. There was a token for one sheep and a token for ten sheep, and a different token for ten goats, etc.

To ensure that nobody could alter the number and type of tokens, they invented the bulla; a clay envelope shaped like a hollow ball into which the tokens on a string were placed and then baked. If anybody contested the number, they could break open the clay envelope and do a recount. To avoid unnecessary damage to the record, they pressed archaic number signs on the outside of the envelope before it was baked, each sign similar in shape to the tokens they represented. Since there was seldom any need to break open the envelope, the signs on the outside became the first written language for writing numbers in clay, using sign-value notation.

Initially, different systems of counting were used in relation to specific kinds of measurement. Much like counting tokens, early Mesopotamian proto-cuneiform numerals often utilised different signs to count or measure different things, and identical signs could be used to represent different quantities depending on what was being counted or measured. Eventually, the sexagesimal system was widely adopted by cuneiform-using cultures. The sexagesimal sign-value system used by the Sumerians and the Akkadians would later evolve into the place-value system of Babylonian cuneiform numerals.

== See also ==
- Place-value notation
- Location arithmetic, a base 2 sign-value notation invented by J. Napier in 1617
