= 2I =

2I or 2-I may refer to:

- Kosmos-2I Soviet rocket
- AceKard 2i, one of the Nintendo DS storage devices
- Base 2i, or Quater-imaginary base
- The binary icosahedral group 2I
- SSH 2I (WA), now U.S. Route 97 in Washington
- The 2i's Coffee Bar in London
- Polikarpov 2I-N1, alternate name for the Polikarpov DI-1 fighter
- Kosmos-2I 63S; see List of Kosmos satellites (1–250)
- 2I/Borisov, the first known interstellar comet

== See also ==
- I2 (disambiguation)
