= I2 =

i2, I-2, I 2 or I2 may refer to:

- I^{2}, a statistical measure of study heterogeneity used in meta-analysis
- I^{2}, a military acronym for an image intensifier
- I_{2}, the chemical formula for molecular iodine
- I2 engine, a designation for a straight-twin engine
- i2 Group, a visual investigative analysis software company
- i2 Technologies, an international supply chain management firm
- Haplogroup I2 (Y-DNA), the human Y-chromosomal haplogroup
- LB&SCR I2 class, a 1907 British class of 4-4-2 steam tank locomotive
- Grigorovich I-2, a biplane fighter aircraft of the Soviet Union
- Internet2, a not-for-profit US computer networking consortium
- Interstate 2, a highway in the US state of Texas
- Highway I–2 (Cuba), route number of the Circuito Sur in southern Cuba
- Göta Life Guards (infantry) (1816–1939), a Swedish Army infantry regiment
- Värmland Regiment (1939–1973), a Swedish Army infantry regiment
- I2, a rank-into-rank axiom in mathematical set theory
- Incredibles 2, a 2018 American animated superhero film by Pixar
- Iberia Express, a Spanish low-cost airline (IATA code: I2)
- Japanese submarine I-2, a Type J1 submarine of the Imperial Japanese Navy
- I_{2}, the logo for Industrial Illusions, a fictional corporation in Yu-Gi-Oh!

== See also ==
- I 2 (EYE), a 1988 album by Michael W. Smith
- i^{2} Aquarii, a star
- Interstate 2 (disambiguation)
- 2I (disambiguation)
