= Puszka Pandory =

1986 video game

- Developer: Marcin Borkowski
- Platform: ZX Spectrum
- Release: 1986
- Genre: Interactive fiction

Puszka Pandory (transl. Pandora's Box) is a Polish computer text game created in 1986 by Marcin Borkowski for the ZX Spectrum computer. The game achieved popularity after trading on the Grzybowska Commodity Exchange (including trade from a lot of pirates, which were rampant in the country at the time due to the communist approach to copyright).

The first version of the game was written in BASIC, and was wiped after the tape was accidentally placed into a tape recorder. Borkowski lost enthusiasm for the game and didn't have a second attempt. He returned to the project in 1986 when house sitting for a friend.

The text compression on the ZX Spectrum computer (due to the fact that it only had 48 kilobytes of memory) imposed many restrictions on programmers, and the game was created as a challenge to see if these restrictions could be bypassed.

According to the book Bajty polskie, by Bartłomiej Kluska and Mariusz Rozwadowski, the game is the first one written by a Pole, intended to be marketed in Poland, and whose description appeared in the Polish press. Bajtek's review of the game is notable for being the first extensive description of a Polish video game in the media. However, Borkowski actually wrote the review himself, under the anagramatic pseudonym Karol B. Mirowski.

== Legacy ==
On the game's 25th anniversary, 100 limited edition copies were released at the Poznań Game Arena, with each copy signed by Borkowski. The games worked on the ZX Spectrum.

== See also ==
- Marienbad, a Polish game designed for the Odra 1003.
