= Vittorio Grünwald =

Italian mathematician (1855–1943)

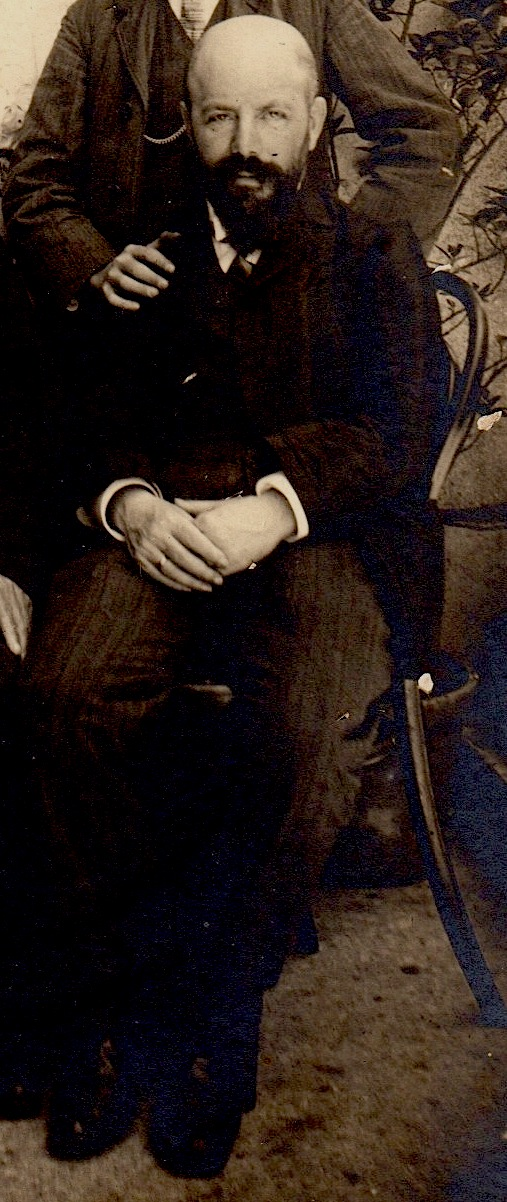
- Vittorio Grünwald
- Born: 13 June 1855; Verona, Papal States
- Died: March 1943 (aged 87); Florence, Kingdom of Italy

Vittorio Grünwald (13 June 1855 – March 1943) was an Italian professor of mathematics and German language.

== Life ==
He was born in Verona on 13 June 1855. His father Guglielmo (Willhelm) Grünwald (son of Aronne and Regina) was Hungarian, his mother Fortuna Marini (daughter of Mandolino Marini and Ricca Bassani) was Italian. In 1861 he moved to Hungary with his family, then came back in 1877 to Verona, later in November 1885 they moved to Brescia, and then to Venice. He studied at the Technische Universität Wien, where he graduated in mathematics. After coming back to Italy, he taught mathematics and German language in several schools (such as in Livorno and Venice), and then he settled in Florence.

He married Dora Olschky, born in Berlin, and had three kids: Marta Grünwald, Beniamino (Benno) Grünwald, and Emanuele Grünwald.

He was a librarian and a teacher at the Rabbinical College of Florence. He died at 88 in Florence, a few months before Nazi's persecutions hit Jewish families in Central Italy. He published several contributions in mathematics, including a seminal work on negative numerical bases. He also published an Italian-German vocabulary.
