= UMC (computer) =

Elwro computer family

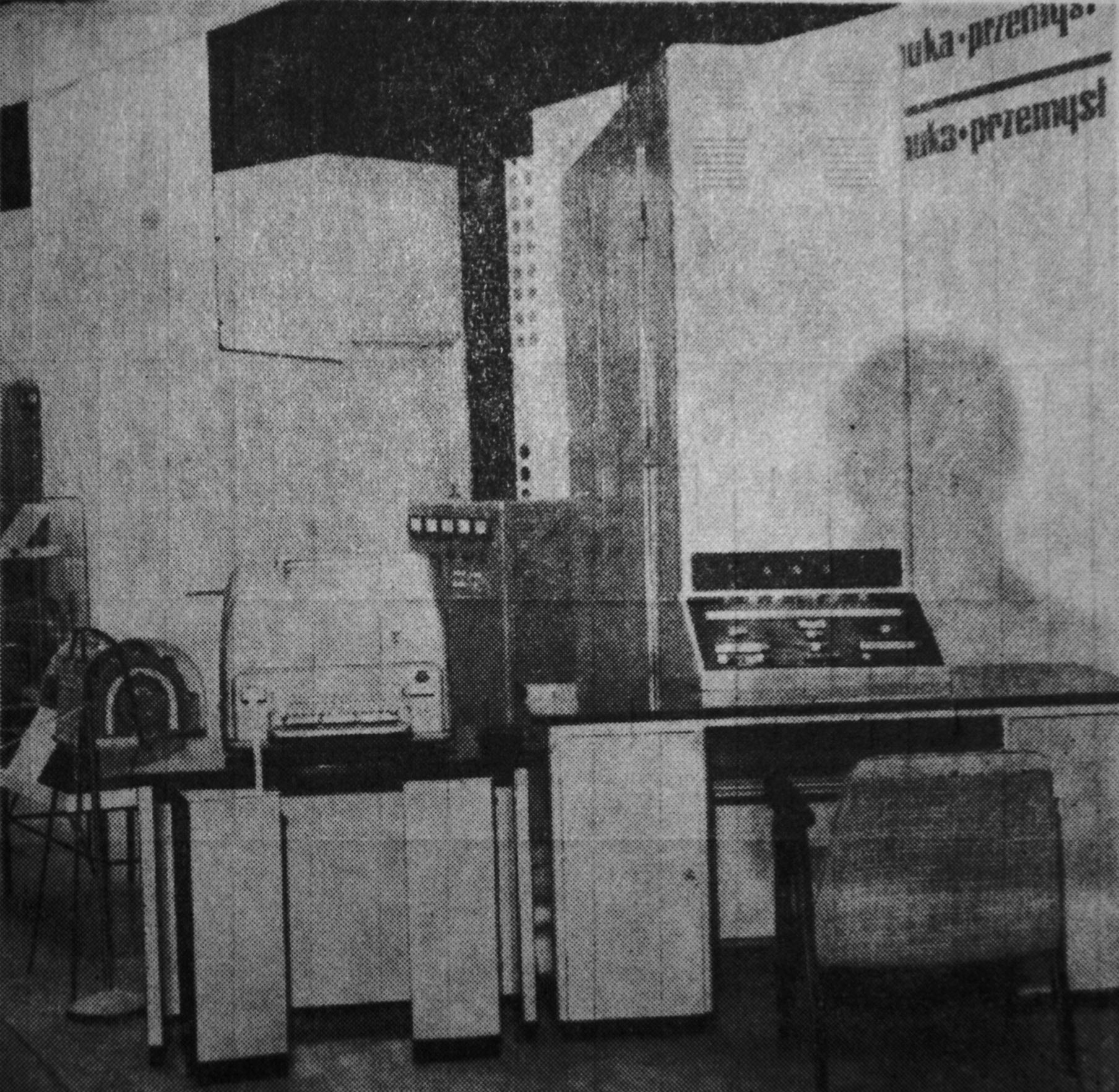
UMC-1

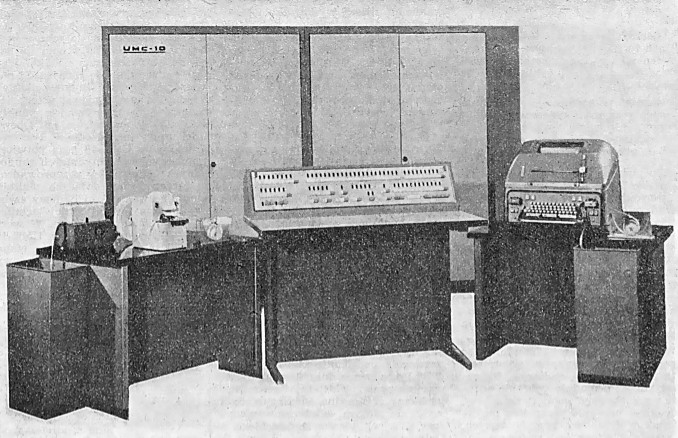
UMC-10

UMC (Uniwersalna Maszyna Cyfrowa - Polish for Universal Digital Machine) is a family of computers produced by Elwro from 1962. It consisted of vacuum-tube based UMC-1 and transistor-based UMC-10 (1964). UMC computers operated using negabinary (-2 base) numeral system invented by prof. Zdzisław Pawlak.
