= Elwro =

Polish computer manufacturer, 1959–1989

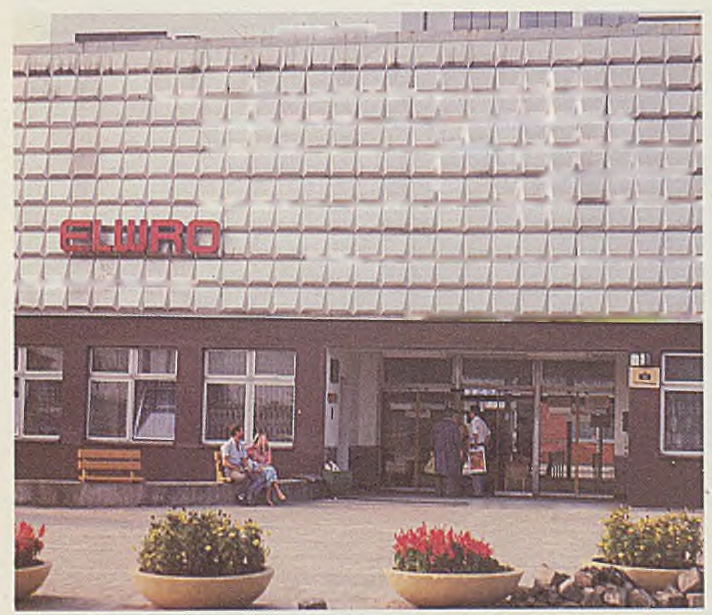
- Industry: Computer industry
- Founded: 6 February 1959 in Wrocław, Poland
- Defunct: 1989
- Fate: Purchased by Siemens
- Successor: Telect
- Headquarters: Wrocław, Poland
- Products: Odra mainframe systems, Elwro 800 Junior microcomputer
- Number of employees: up to 6000

Elwro was a Polish company that manufactured mainframe and microcomputers from 1959 until 1989. Its plant was in Wrocław. Computer models included Odra mainframe systems, and the Elwro 800 Junior microcomputer for education.

== Overview ==
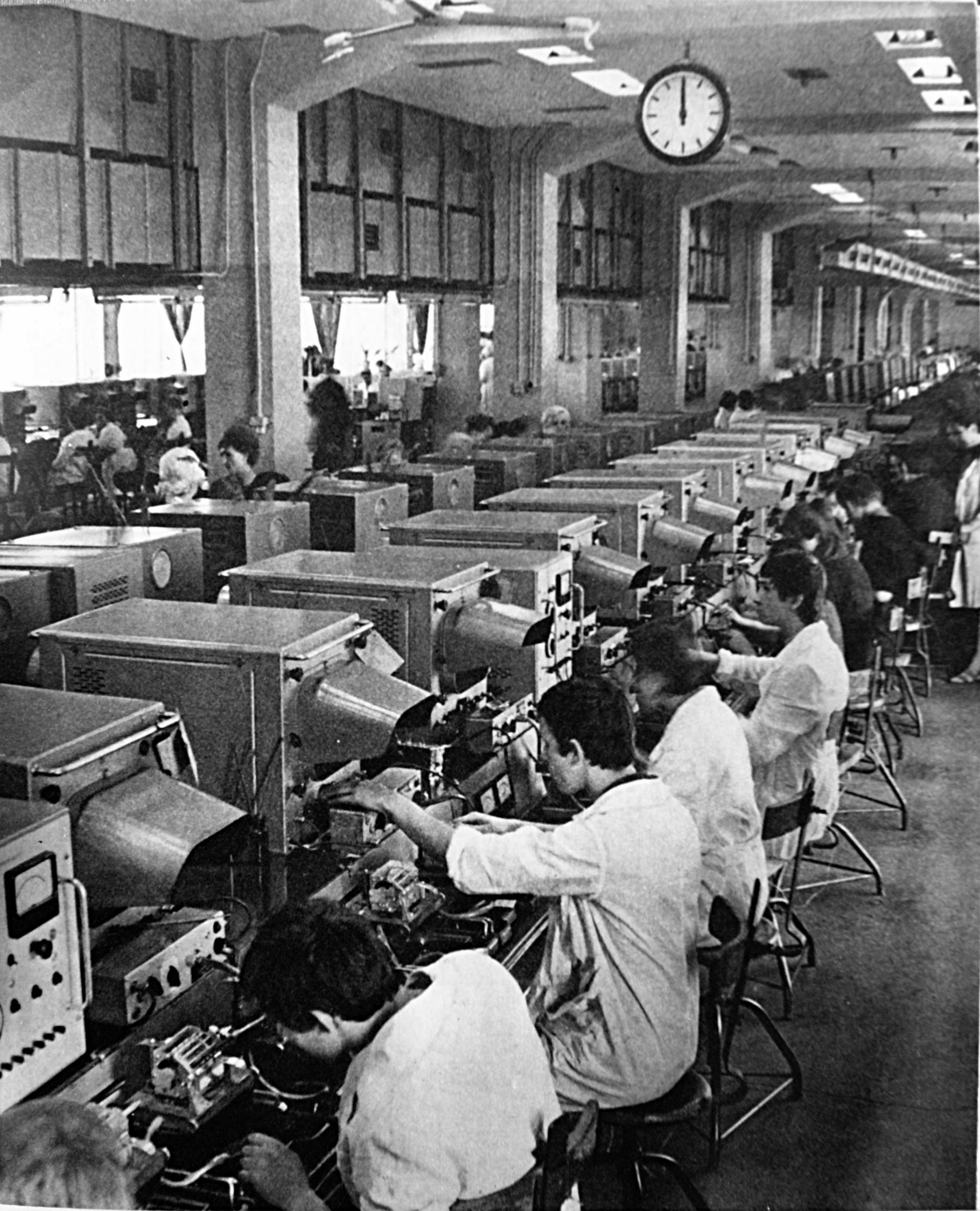
1969

The Wrocław Electronic Works (Wrocławskie Zakłady Elektroniczne) were established on 6 February 1959; the name Elwro was derived from the company's telegraphic address. The first model designed at this plant was the vacuum-tube based Odra 1001, released in December 1960; this was a research computer not put into serial production. The next model was the Odra 1002 which was constructed from transistors made in Poland, in 1962. The Elwro factory was responsible for mass production of the tube-based UMC-1 designed at Warsaw University of Technology; twenty-five units were built from 1962 through 1965. Concurrently, design work was proceeding on the Odra 1003 transistor computer, which was faster than the UMC-1, and used much less power. The first 1003 was built in 1963 and work was continued on improvements, resulting in the 1013 which was faster, and had a 256 word core memory as well as a drum with 8,000 words.

In 1966, the Odra 1204 was built, with 16 k words of magnetic core memory and a 130 k word drum. This machine was aimed at data processing. However, software production was a bottleneck and the company was directed to produce a computer compatible with the ICL 1900; this "compatible" machine was the Odra 1304. It went into serial production in 1970. The Odra 1305 used integrated circuits and began production in 1970; it had one million bytes of main memory and disk drives to store 100 million bytes. The 1325 became popular because it supported common programming languages of the time such as ALGOL, COBOL and FORTRAN.

By 1966 the factory had built 100 computers.

From 1985 to 1990 Elwro produced the Elwro 800 Junior microcomputer for education.

Peak employment at the plant was up to 6,000 people. The factory was privatized in 1993 and purchased by Siemens, but wound down production. In 2000, the remains of the company were purchased by an American company, Telect, with plans to manufacture telecommunications equipment.

In 2015, the Wrocław city council named the former location of the factory, ELWRO Square, to commemorate the company's contributions to information technology.

== Gallery ==
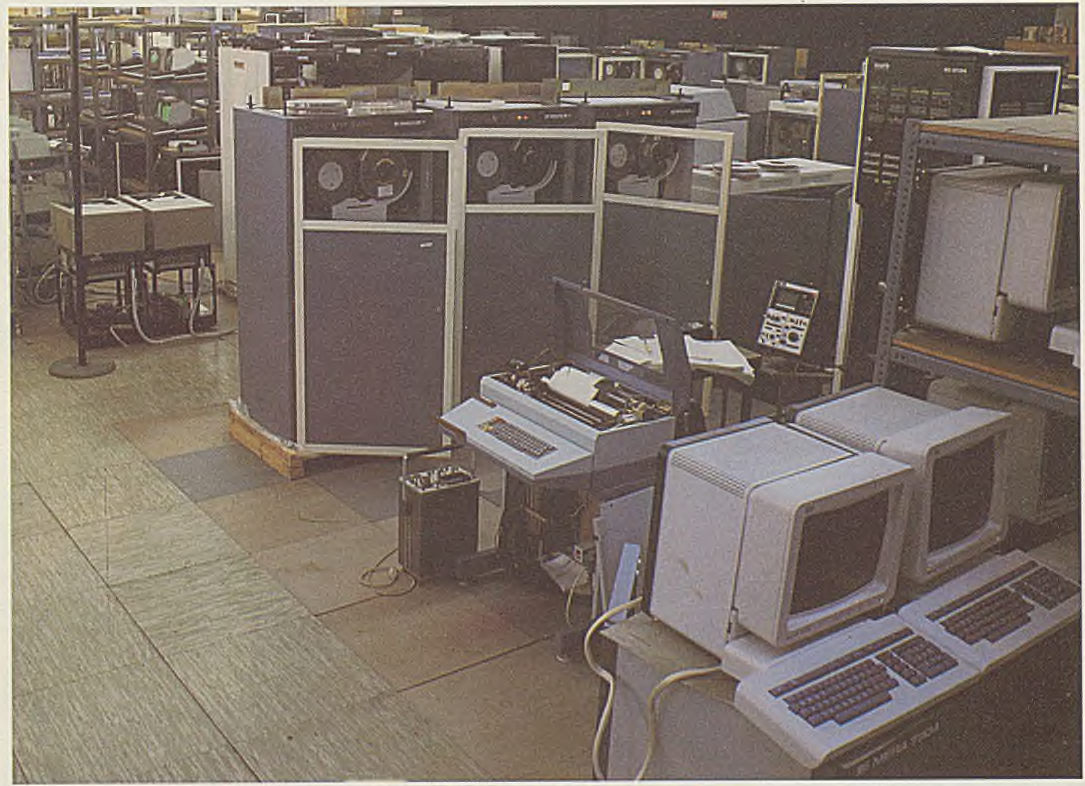
Terminals and tape memory

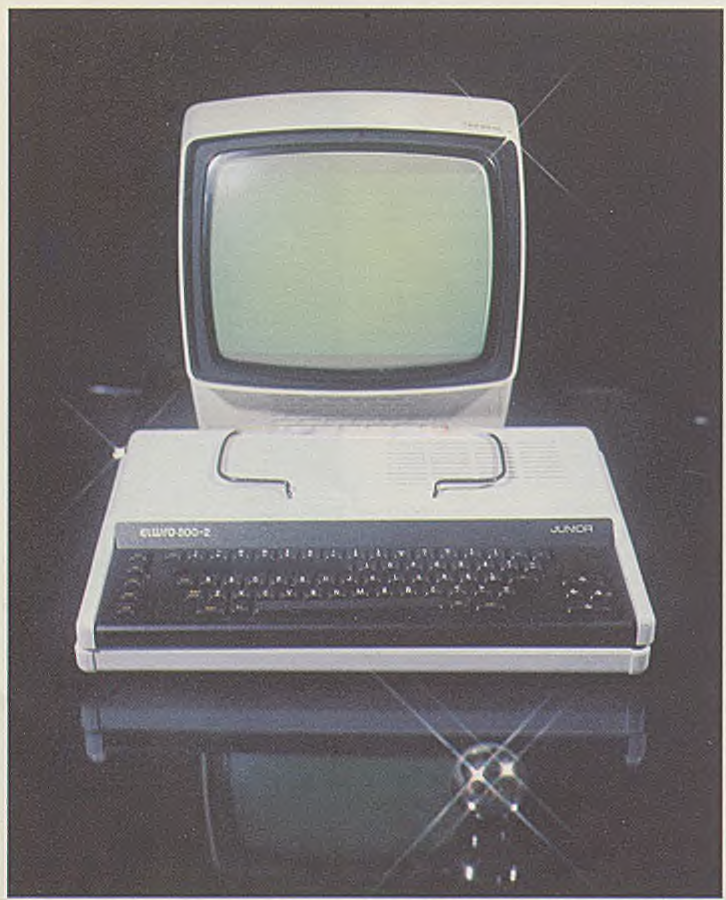
Elwro 800 Junior

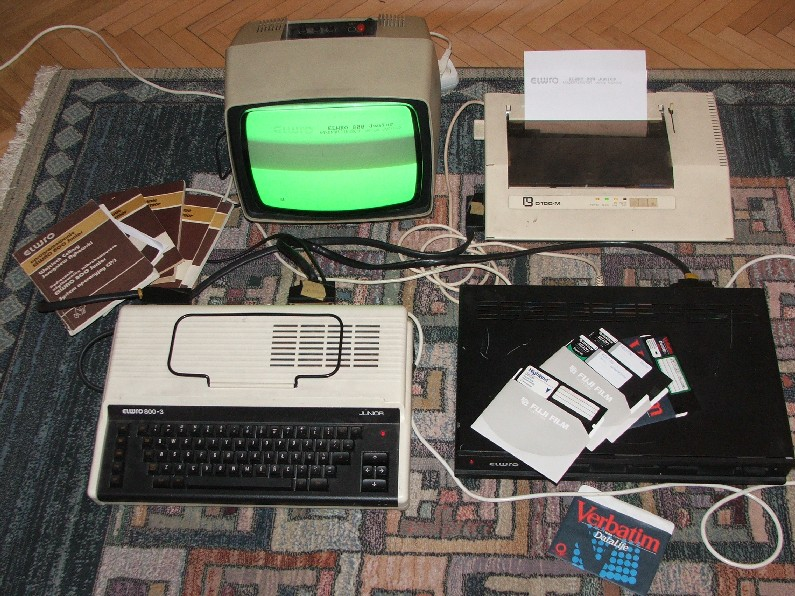
Elwro 800 Junior system

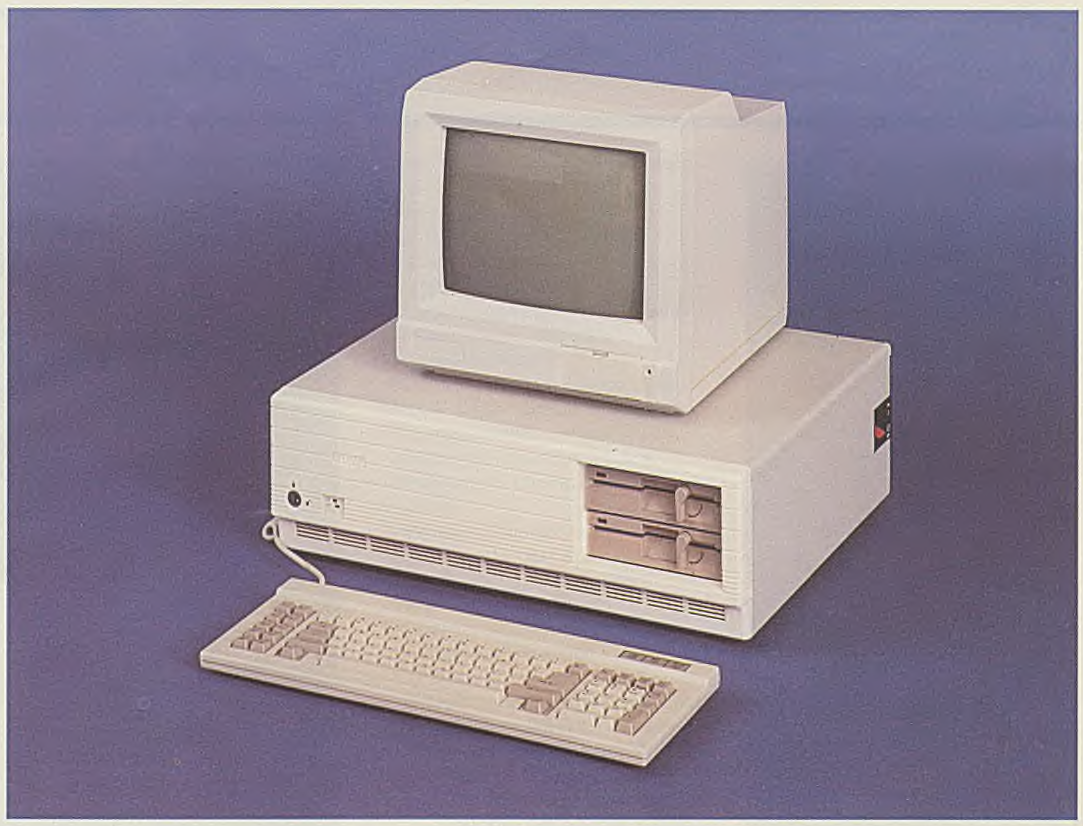
Elwro 801AT

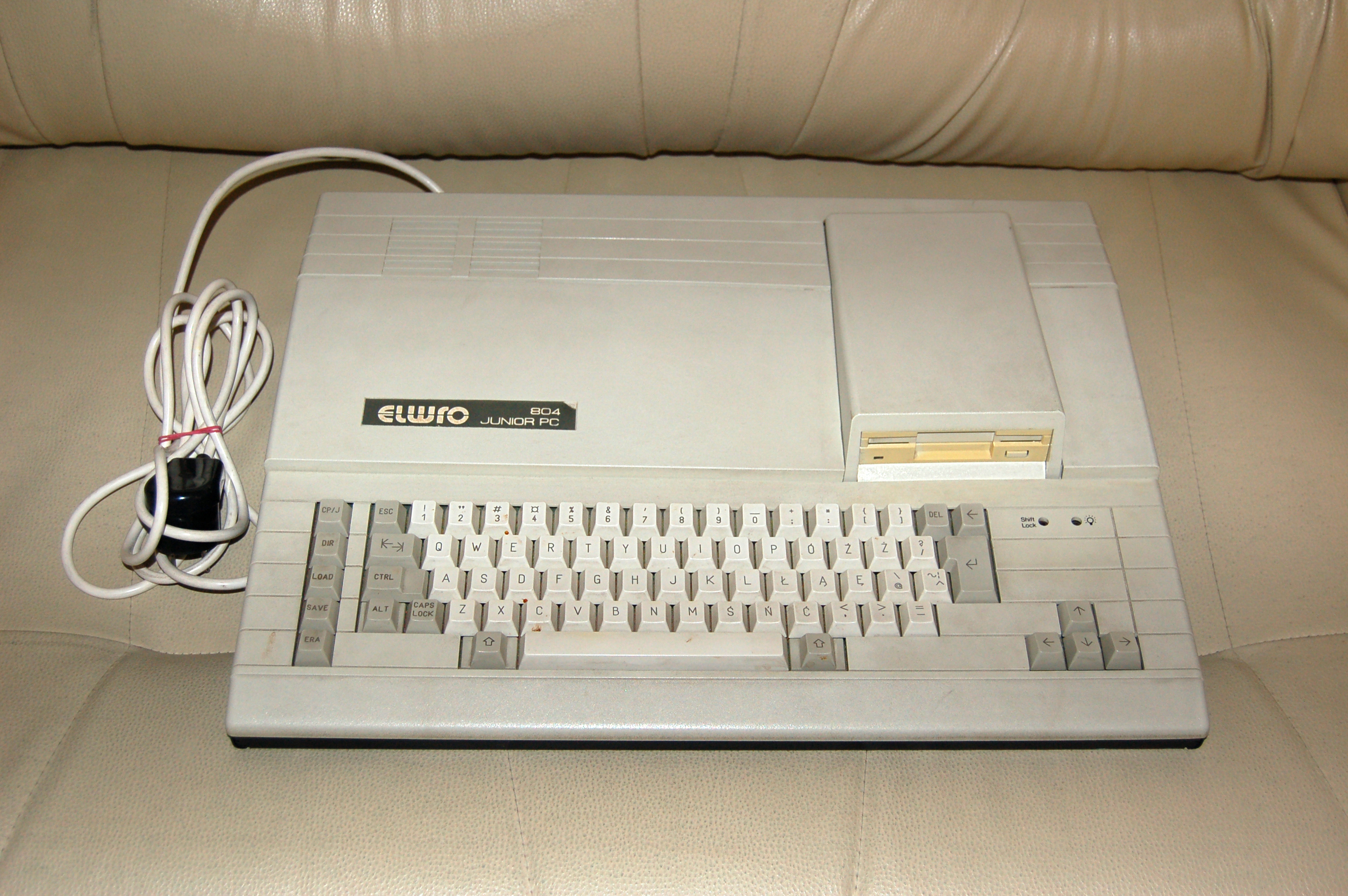
Elwro 804 Junior PC

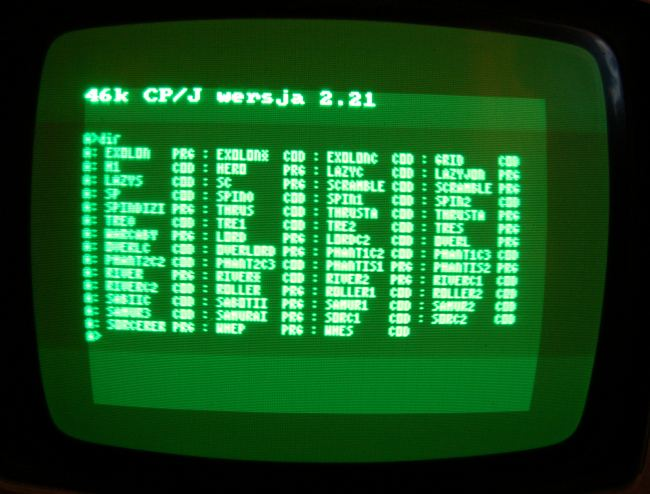
Elwro 804 Junior PC running CP/M

== See also ==
- History of computing in Poland
- Jan Węglarz
