= Negative base =

Non-standard positional numeral system

A negative base (or negative radix) may be used to construct a non-standard positional numeral system. Like other place-value systems, each position holds multiples of the appropriate power of the system's base; but that base is negative—that is to say, the base b is equal to −r for some natural number r (r ≥ 2).

Negative-base systems can accommodate all the same numbers as standard place-value systems, but both positive and negative numbers are represented without the use of a minus sign (or, in computer representation, a sign bit); this advantage is countered by an increased complexity of arithmetic operations. The need to store the information normally contained by a negative sign often results in a negative-base number being one digit longer than its positive-base equivalent.

The common names for negative-base positional numeral systems are formed by prefixing nega- to the name of the corresponding positive-base system; for example, negadecimal (base −10) corresponds to decimal (base 10), negabinary (base −2) to binary (base 2), negaternary (base −3) to ternary (base 3), and negaquaternary (base −4) to quaternary (base 4).

== Example ==
Consider what is meant by the representation 12243 in the negadecimal system, whose base b is −10:

Multiples of
(−10)^{4} = 10000	(−10)^{3} = −1000	(−10)^{2} = 100	(−10)^{1} = −10	(−10)^{0} = 1
1	2	2	4	3

The representation 12243_{−10} (which is intended to be negadecimal notation) is equivalent to 8,163_{10} in decimal notation, because 10,000 + (−2,000) + 200 + (−40) + 3 = 8163.

Remark

On the other hand, −8163_{10} in decimal would be written 9977_{−10} in negadecimal.

== History ==
Negative numerical bases were first considered by Vittorio Grünwald in an 1885 monograph published in Giornale di Matematiche di Battaglini. Grünwald gave algorithms for performing addition, subtraction, multiplication, division, root extraction, divisibility tests, and radix conversion. Negative bases were later mentioned in passing by A. J. Kempner in 1936 and studied in more detail by Zdzisław Pawlak and A. Wakulicz in 1957.

Negabinary was implemented in the early Polish computer BINEG (and UMC), built 1957–59, based on ideas by Z. Pawlak and A. Lazarkiewicz from the Mathematical Institute in Warsaw. Implementations since then have been rare.

zfp, a floating-point compression algorithm from the Lawrence Livermore National Laboratory, uses negabinary to store numbers. According to zfp's documentation:

Unlike sign-magnitude representations, the leftmost one-bit in negabinary simultaneously encodes the sign and approximate magnitude of a number. Moreover, unlike two’s complement, numbers small in magnitude have many leading zeros in negabinary regardless of sign, which facilitates encoding.

== Notation and use ==
Denoting the base as −r, every integer a can be written uniquely as

$$a = \sum_{i=0}^{n}d_{i}(-r)^{i}$$

where each digit d_{k} is an integer from 0 to r − 1 and the leading digit d_{n} > 0 (unless n = 0). The base −r expansion of a is then given by the string d_{n}d_{n−1}...d_{1}d_{0}.

Negative-base systems may thus be compared to signed-digit representations, such as balanced ternary, where the radix is positive but the digits are taken from a partially negative range. (In the table below the digit of value −1 is written as the single character T.)

Some numbers have the same representation in base −r as in base r. For example, the numbers from 100 to 109 have the same representations in decimal and negadecimal. Similarly,

$$17=2^4+2^0=(-2)^4+(-2)^0$$

and is represented by 10001 in binary and 10001 in negabinary.

Some numbers with their expansions in a number of positive and corresponding negative bases are:

Decimal	Negadecimal	Binary	Negabinary	Ternary	Negaternary	Balanced ternary	Balanced negaternary	Quaternary	Negaquaternary
−15	25	−1111	110001	−120	1220	T110	11T0	−33	1301
⋮
−5	15	−101	1111	−12	21	T11	TT1	−11	23
−4	16	−100	1100	−11	22	TT	1T	−10	10
−3	17	−11	1101	−10	10	T0	10	−3	11
−2	18	−10	10	−2	11	T1	11	−2	12
−1	19	−1	11	−1	12	T	T	−1	13
0	0	0	0	0	0	0	0	0	0
1	1	1	1	1	1	1	1	1	1
2	2	10	110	2	2	1T	TT	2	2
3	3	11	111	10	120	10	T0	3	3
4	4	100	100	11	121	11	T1	10	130
5	5	101	101	12	122	1TT	11T	11	131
6	6	110	11010	20	110	1T0	110	12	132
7	7	111	11011	21	111	1T1	111	13	133
8	8	1000	11000	22	112	10T	10T	20	120
9	9	1001	11001	100	100	100	100	21	121
10	190	1010	11110	101	101	101	101	22	122
11	191	1011	11111	102	102	11T	1TT	23	123
12	192	1100	11100	110	220	110	1T0	30	110
13	193	1101	11101	111	221	111	1T1	31	111
14	194	1110	10010	112	222	1TTT	TT1T	32	112
15	195	1111	10011	120	210	1TT0	TT10	33	113
16	196	10000	10000	121	211	1TT1	TT11	100	100
17	197	10001	10001	122	212	1T0T	TT0T	101	101
18	198	10010	10110	200	200	1T00	TT00	102	102

Note that, with the exception of nega balanced ternary, the base −r expansions of negative integers have an even number of digits, while the base −r expansions of the non-negative integers have an odd number of digits.

== Calculation ==
The base −r expansion of a number can be found by repeated division by −r, recording the non-negative remainders in $\{0, 1, \ldots, r-1\}$, and concatenating those remainders, starting with the last. Note that if a / b is c with remainder d, then bc + d = a and therefore d = a − bc. To arrive at the correct conversion, the value for c must be chosen such that d is non-negative and minimal. For the fourth line of the following example this means that

$$-5 \div (-3) = 2 ~\mathrm{remainder}~ 1$$

has to be chosen — and not $= 3 ~\mathrm{remainder}~ 4$ nor $= 1 ~\mathrm{remainder}~ -\!2.$

For example, to convert 146 in decimal to negaternary:

$$\begin{array}{rr}
146 \div (-3) = & -48 ~\mathrm{remainder}~ 2 \\
-48 \div (-3) = &  16 ~\mathrm{remainder}~ 0 \\
16 \div (-3) = &  -5 ~\mathrm{remainder}~ 1 \\
-5 \div (-3) = &   2 ~\mathrm{remainder}~ 1 \\
2 \div (-3) = &   0 ~\mathrm{remainder}~ 2
\end{array}$$

Reading the remainders backward we obtain the negaternary representation of 146_{10}: 21102_{–3}.

Proof: −3 · (−3 · (−3 · (−3 · ( 2 ) + 1 ) + 1 ) + 0 ) + 2 = (((2 · (−3) + 1) · (−3) + 1) · (−3) + 0) · (−3) + 2 = 146_{10}.

Reading the remainders forward we can obtain the negaternary least-significant-digit-first representation.

Proof: 2 + ( 0 + ( 1 + ( 1 + ( 2 ) · −3 ) · −3) · −3 ) · −3 = 146_{10}.

Note that in most programming languages, the result (in integer arithmetic) of dividing a negative number by a negative number is rounded towards 0, usually leaving a negative remainder. In such a case we have a = (−r)c + d = (−r)c + d − r + r = (−r)(c + 1) + (d + r). Because |d| < r, (d + r) is the positive remainder. Therefore, to get the correct result in such case, computer implementations of the above algorithm should add 1 and r to the quotient and remainder respectively.

=== Example implementation code ===
==== To negabinary ====
===== C# =====
static string ToNegabinary(int val)
{
	string result = string.Empty;

	while (val != 0)
	{
		int remainder = val % -2;
		val = val / -2;

		if (remainder < 0)
		{
			remainder += 2;
			val += 1;
		}

		result = remainder.ToString() + result;
	}

	return result;
}

===== C++ =====
auto to_negabinary(int value)
{
    std::bitset<sizeof(int) * CHAR_BIT > result;
    std::size_t bit_position = 0;

    while (value != 0)
    {
        const auto div_result = std::div(value, -2);

        if (div_result.rem < 0)
            value = div_result.quot + 1;
        else
            value = div_result.quot;

        result.set(bit_position, div_result.rem != 0);

        ++bit_position;
    }

    return result;
}

==== To negaternary ====
===== C# =====
static string Negaternary(int val)
{
	string result = string.Empty;

	while (val != 0)
	{
		int remainder = val % -3;
		val = val / -3;

		if (remainder < 0)
		{
			remainder += 3;
			val += 1;
		}

		result = remainder.ToString() + result;
	}

	return result;
}

===== Python =====
def negaternary(i: int) -> str:
    """Decimal to negaternary"""
    if i == 0:
        digits = ["0"]
    else:
        digits = []
        while i != 0:
            i, remainder = divmod(i, -3)
            if remainder < 0:
                i, remainder = i + 1, remainder + 3
            digits.append(str(remainder))
    return "".join(digits[::-1])

>>> negaternary(1000)
'2212001'

===== Common Lisp =====
(defun negaternary (i)
  (if (zerop i)
      "0"
      (let ((digits "")
            (rem 0))
        (loop while (not (zerop i)) do
          (progn
            (multiple-value-setq (i rem) (truncate i -3))
            (when (minusp rem)
              (incf i)
              (incf rem 3))
            (setf digits (concatenate 'string (write-to-string rem) digits))))
        digits)))

==== To any negative base ====
===== Java =====
import java.util.ArrayList;
import java.util.Collections;
public ArrayList<Integer> negativeBase(int input, int base) {
    ArrayList<Integer> result_rev = new ArrayList<>();
    int number = input;
    while (number != 0) {
        int i = number % base;
        number /= base;
        if (i < 0) {
            i += Math.abs(base);
            number++;
        }
        result_rev.add(i);
    }
    return Collections.reverse(result_rev.clone());
}

The above gives the result in an ArrayList of integers, so that the code does not have to handle how to represent a base smaller than −10. To display the result as a string, one can decide on a mapping of base to characrters. For example:

import java.util.stream.Collectors;
final String alphabet = "0123456789abcdefghijklmnopqrstuvwxyzABCDEFGHIJKLMNOPQRSTUVWXYZ@_";
public String toBaseString(ArrayList<Integer> lst) {
    // Would throw exception if base is beyond the 64 possible characters
    return lst.stream().map(n -> alphabet[n]).collect(Collectors.joining(""));
}

===== AutoLisp =====
(defun negabase (num baz / dig rst)
  ;; NUM is any number.
  ;; BAZ is any number in the interval [-10, -2]. (This is forced by how we do string notation.)
  ;;
  ;; NUM and BAZ will be truncated to an integer if they're floats (e.g. 14.25
  ;; will be truncated to 14, -123456789.87 to -123456789, etc.).
  (if (and (numberp num)
           (numberp baz)
           (<= (fix baz) -2)
           (> (fix baz) -11))
      (progn
        (setq baz (float (fix baz))
              num (float (fix num))
              dig (if (= num 0) "0" ""))
        (while (/= num 0)
               (setq rst (- num (* baz (setq num (fix (/ num baz))))))
               (if (minusp rst)
                   (setq num (1+ num)
                         rst (- rst baz)))
               (setq dig (strcat (itoa (fix rst)) dig)))
        dig)
      (progn
        (prompt
         (cond
           ((and (not (numberp num))
                 (not (numberp baz)))
            "\nWrong number and negabase.")
           ((not (numberp num))
            "\nWrong number.")
           ((not (numberp baz))
            "\nWrong negabase.")
           (t
            "\nNegabase must be inside [-10 -2] interval.")))
        (princ))))

=== Shortcut calculation ===
The following algorithms assume that

1. the input is available in bitstrings and coded in (base +2; digits in $\{0, 1\}$) (as in most of today's digital computers),
2. there are add (+) and xor (^) operations, which operate on such bitstrings (as in most of today's digital computers),
3. the set $D$ of output digits is standard, i. e. $D = \{0, |b|-1\}$ with base $b\in \{-2,-4\}$,
4. the output is coded in the same bitstring format, but the meaning of the places is another one.

==== To negabinary ====
The conversion to negabinary (base −2; digits in $\{0, 1\}$) allows a remarkable shortcut (C implementation):

uint32_t toNegaBinary(uint32_t value) // input in standard binary
{
	uint32_t Schroeppel2 = 0xAAAAAAAA; // = 2/3*((2*2)^16-1) = ...1010
	return (value + Schroeppel2) ^ Schroeppel2; // eXclusive OR
	// resulting unsigned int to be interpreted as string of elements ε {0,1} (bits)
}

JavaScript port for the same shortcut calculation:

function toNegaBinary(value) {
    const Schroeppel2 = 0xAAAAAAAA;
    // Convert as in C, then convert to a NegaBinary String
    return ( ( value + Schroeppel2 ) ^ Schroeppel2 ).toString(2);
}

The algorithm is first described by Schroeppel in the HAKMEM (1972) as item 128. The Wolfram MathWorld documents a version in the Wolfram Language by D. Librik (Szudzik).

==== To negaquaternary ====
The conversion to negaquaternary (base −4; digits in $\{0, 1, 2, 3\}$) allows a similar shortcut (C implementation):

uint32_t toNegaQuaternary(uint32_t value) // input in standard binary
{
	uint32_t Schroeppel4 = 0xCCCCCCCC; // = 4/5*((2*4)^8-1) = ...11001100 = ...3030
	return (value + Schroeppel4) ^ Schroeppel4; // eXclusive OR
	// resulting unsigned int to be interpreted as string of elements ε {0,1,2,3} (pairs of bits)
}

JavaScript port for the same shortcut calculation:

function toNegaQuaternary(value) {
    const Schroeppel4 = 0xCCCCCCCC;
    // Convert as in C, then convert to NegaQuaternary String
    return ( ( value + Schroeppel4 ) ^ Schroeppel4 ).toString(4);
}

== Arithmetic operations ==
The following describes the arithmetic operations for negabinary; calculations in larger bases are similar.

=== Addition ===
Adding negabinary numbers proceeds bitwise, starting from the least significant bits; the bits from each addend are summed with the (balanced ternary) carry from the previous bit (0 at the LSB). This sum is then decomposed into an output bit and carry for the next iteration as show in the table:

Sum		Output			Comment
Sum		Bit	Carry		Comment
−2	010_{−2}	0	1	01_{−2}	−2 occurs only during subtraction.
−1	011_{−2}	1	1	01_{−2}	
0	000_{−2}	0	0	00_{−2}	
1	001_{−2}	1	0	00_{−2}	
2	110_{−2}	0	−1	11_{−2}	
3	111_{−2}	1	−1	11_{−2}	3 occurs only during addition.

The second row of this table, for instance, expresses the fact that −1 = 1 + 1 × −2; the fifth row says 2 = 0 + −1 × −2; etc.

As an example, to add 1010101_{−2} (1 + 4 + 16 + 64 = 85) and 1110100_{−2} (4 + 16 − 32 + 64 = 52),

Carry:          1 −1  0 −1  1 −1  0  0  0
First addend:         1  0  1  0  1  0  1
Second addend:        1  1  1  0  1  0  0 +
               --------------------------
Number:         1 −1  2  0  3 −1  2  0  1
Bit (result):   1  1  0  0  1  1  0  0  1
Carry:          0  1 −1  0 −1  1 −1  0  0

so the result is 110011001_{−2} (1 − 8 + 16 − 128 + 256 = 137).

==== Another method ====
While adding two negabinary numbers, every time a carry is generated an extra carry should be propagated to next bit. Consider same example as above

Extra carry:    1  1  1  0  1  0  0  0     
Carry:             0  1  1  0  1  0  0  0
First addend:         1  0  1  0  1  0  1
Second addend:        1  1  1  0  1  0  0 +
               --------------------------
Answer:         1  1  0  0  1  1  0  0  1

==== Negabinary full adder ====
A full adder circuit can be designed to add numbers in negabinary. The following logic is used to calculate the sum and carries:

$$s_i = a_i \oplus b_i \oplus c_i^+ \oplus c_i^-$$
$$c_{i+1}^+ = \overline{a_i}\overline{b_i}\overline{c_i^+}c_i^-$$
$$c_{i+1}^- = a_i b_i \overline{c_i^-} + (a_i \oplus b_i)c_i^+ \overline{c_i^-}$$

==== Incrementing negabinary numbers ====
Incrementing a negabinary number can be done by using the following formula:

$$2x \oplus ((2x \oplus x) + 1)$$

(The operations in this formula are to be interpreted as operations on regular binary numbers. For example, $2x$ is a binary left shift by one bit.)

=== Subtraction ===
To subtract, multiply each bit of the second number by −1, and add the numbers, using the same table as above.

As an example, to compute 1101001_{−2} (1 − 8 − 32 + 64 = 25) minus 1110100_{−2} (4 + 16 − 32 + 64 = 52),

Carry:          0  1 −1  1  0  0  0
First number:   1  1  0  1  0  0  1
Second number: −1 −1 −1  0 −1  0  0 +
               --------------------
Number:         0  1 −2  2 −1  0  1
Bit (result):   0  1  0  0  1  0  1
Carry:          0  0  1 −1  1  0  0

so the result is 100101_{−2} (1 + 4 −32 = −27).

Unary negation, −x, can be computed as binary subtraction from zero, 0 − x.

=== Multiplication and division ===
Shifting to the left multiplies by −2, shifting to the right divides by −2.

To multiply, multiply like normal decimal or binary numbers, but using the negabinary rules for adding the carry, when adding the numbers.

First number:                   1  1  1  0  1  1  0
Second number:                  1  0  1  1  0  1  1 ×
              -------------------------------------
                                1  1  1  0  1  1  0
                             1  1  1  0  1  1  0

                       1  1  1  0  1  1  0
                    1  1  1  0  1  1  0

              1  1  1  0  1  1  0                   +
              -------------------------------------
Carry:        0 −1  0 −1 −1 −1 −1 −1  0 −1  0  0
Number:       1  0  2  1  2  2  2  3  2  0  2  1  0
Bit (result): 1  0  0  1  0  0  0  1  0  0  0  1  0
Carry:           0 −1  0 −1 −1 −1 −1 −1  0 −1  0  0

For each column, add carry to number, and divide the sum by −2, to get the new carry, and the resulting bit as the remainder.

=== Comparing negabinary numbers ===
It is possible to compare negabinary numbers by slightly adjusting a normal unsigned binary comparator. When comparing the numbers $A$ and $B$, invert each odd positioned bit of both numbers. After this, compare $A$ and $B$ using a standard unsigned comparator.

== Fractional numbers ==
Base −r representation may of course be carried beyond the radix point, allowing the representation of non-integer numbers.

As with positive-base systems, terminating representations correspond to fractions where the denominator is a power of the base; repeating representations correspond to other rationals, and for the same reason.

=== Non-unique representations ===
Unlike positive-base systems, where integers and terminating fractions have non-unique representations (for example, in decimal 0.999... = 1) in negative-base systems the integers have only a single representation. However, there do exist rationals with non-unique representations. For the digits {0, 1, ..., t} with $\mathbf{t}:=r - 1 = -b - 1$ the biggest digit and

$$T:=0.\overline{01}_b = \sum_{i=1}^{\infty} b^{-2i} = \frac1{b^2-1} = \frac1{r^2-1}$$

we have

$0.\overline{0\mathbf{t}}_b=\mathbf{t}T=\frac{r\!-\!\!1}{r^2-1}=\frac1{r+1}$ as well as
$$1.\overline{\mathbf{t}0}_b = 1+\mathbf{t}bT = \frac{(r^2-1)+(r\!-\!\!1)b}{r^2-1}= \frac1{r+1}.$$

So every number $\frac1{r+1}+z$ with a terminating fraction $z\in \Z r^{\Z}$ added has two distinct representations.

For example, in negaternary, i.e. $b=-3$ and $\mathbf{t}=2$, there is

$$1.\overline{02}_{(-3)} = \frac{5}{4} = 2.\overline{20}_{(-3)}$$.

Such non-unique representations can be found by considering the largest and smallest possible representations with integer parts 0 and 1 respectively, and then noting that they are equal. (Indeed, this works with any integer-base system.) The rationals thus non-uniquely expressible are those of form

$$\frac{z(r+1) + 1}{b^i(r + 1)}$$

with $z,i\in \Z.$

== Imaginary base ==
Just as using a negative base allows the representation of negative numbers without an explicit negative sign, using an imaginary base allows the representation of Gaussian integers. Donald Knuth proposed the quater-imaginary base (base 2i) in 1955.

== See also ==
- Binary
- Balanced ternary
- Quaternary numeral system
- Numeral systems
- 1 − 2 + 4 − 8 + ⋯ (p-adic numbers)
