= Interstate 2 (disambiguation) =

Interstate 2 may refer to any of four unconnected Interstate Highways in the United States:

- Interstate 2 in Texas
- Interstate A-2 in Alaska
- Interstate H-2 in Hawaii
- Interstate PRI-2 in Puerto Rico
