= Odra (computer) =

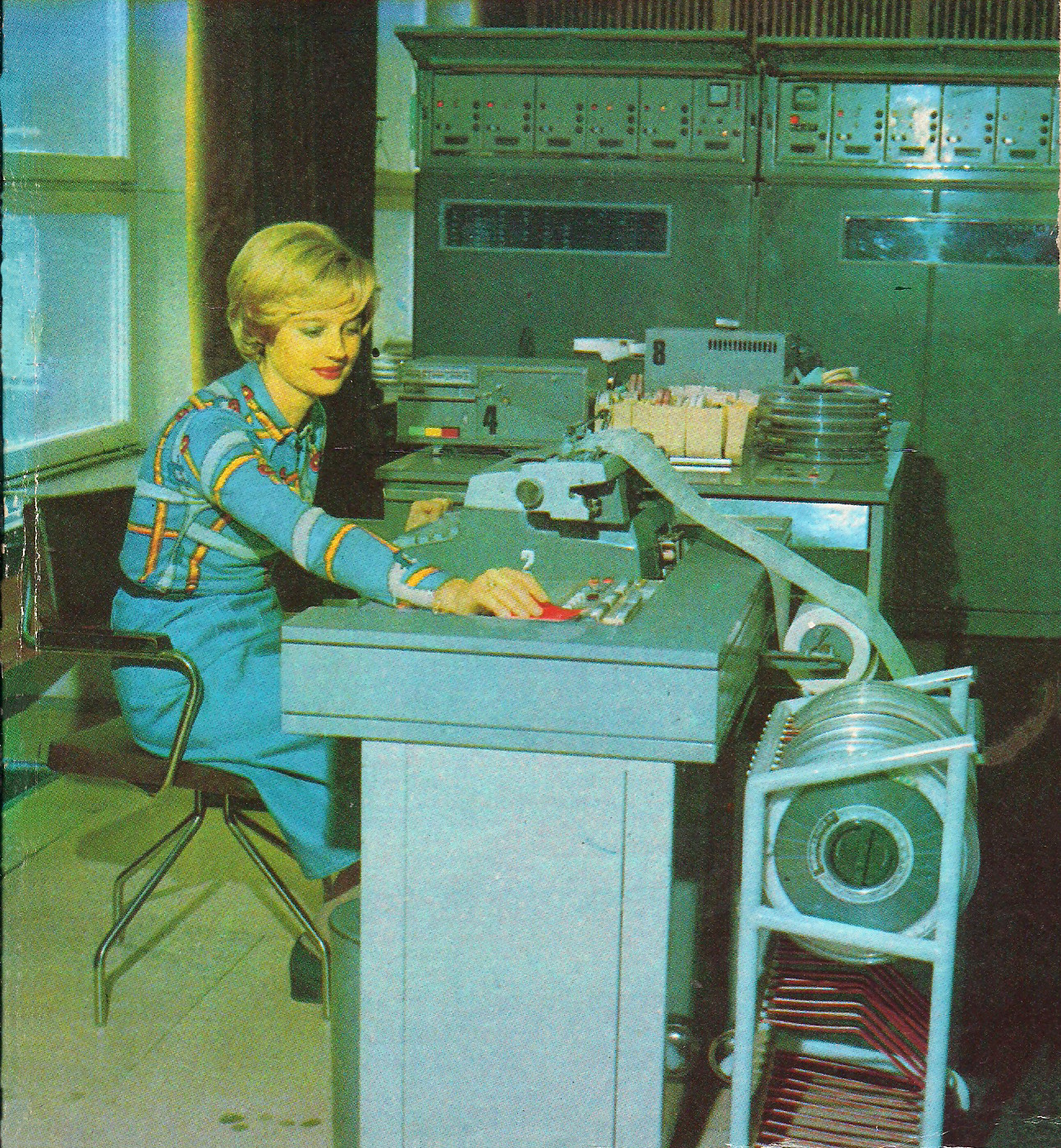
- Odra model 1304
- Manufacturer: Elwro
- Type: Mainframe computers
- Released: 1959; 67 years ago
- Operating system: SODA (Odra 1204)

Odra was a line of computers manufactured in Wrocław, Poland. The name comes from the Odra river that flows through the city of Wrocław.

== Overview ==
The production started in 1959–1960. Models 1001, 1002, 1003, 1013, 1103, 1204 were of original Polish construction. Models 1304 and 1305 were functional counterparts of ICL 1905 and 1906 due to software agreement. The last model was 1325 based on two models by ICL.

The computers were built at the Elwro manufacturing plant, which was closed in 1993.

Odra 1002 was capable of only 100–400 operations per second.

In 1962, Witold Podgórski, an employee of Elwro, created computer game Marienbad on a prototype of Odra 1003; it was an adaptation of a variant of Nim, as depicted in the film Last Year at Marienbad. The computer could play a perfect game and was guaranteed to win. The game was never distributed outside of the Elwro company, but its versions appeared elsewhere. It was probably the first Polish computer game in history.

The operating system used by the Odra 1204 is called SODA. It was designed to work on a small computer without magnetic storage and can run simultaneous loading and execution of programs.

An Odra 1204 computer was used by a team in Leningrad developing an ALGOL 68 compiler in 1976. The Odra 1204 ran the syntax analysis, code generation ran on an IBM System/360.

Up until 30 April 2010 there was still one Odra 1305 working at the railway station in Wrocław Brochów. The system was shut down at 22:00 CEST and replaced with a contemporary computer system.

The Museum of the History of Computers and Information Technology (Muzeum Historii Komputerów i Informatyki) in Katowice, Poland started a project to recommission an Odra 1305 in 2017.

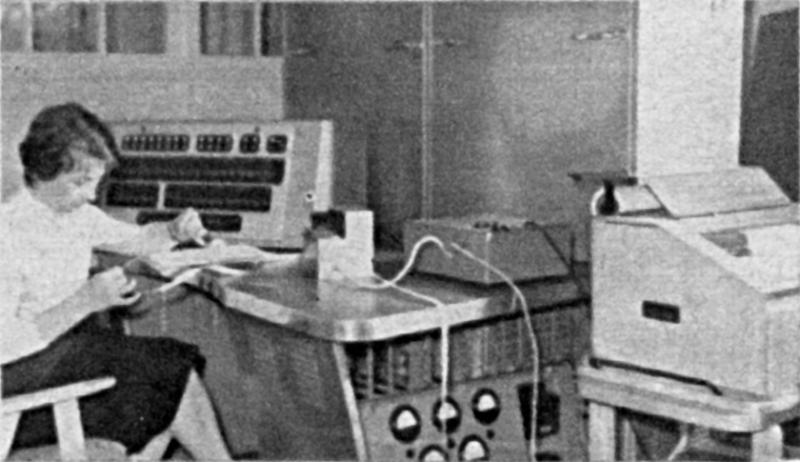
Odra model 1001

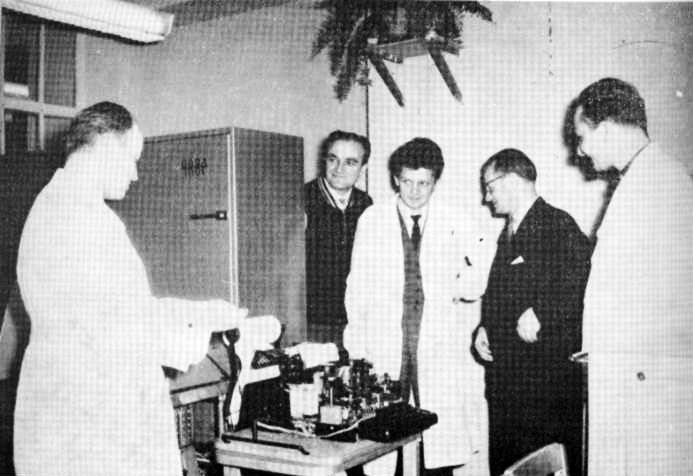
Odra model 1001 development team

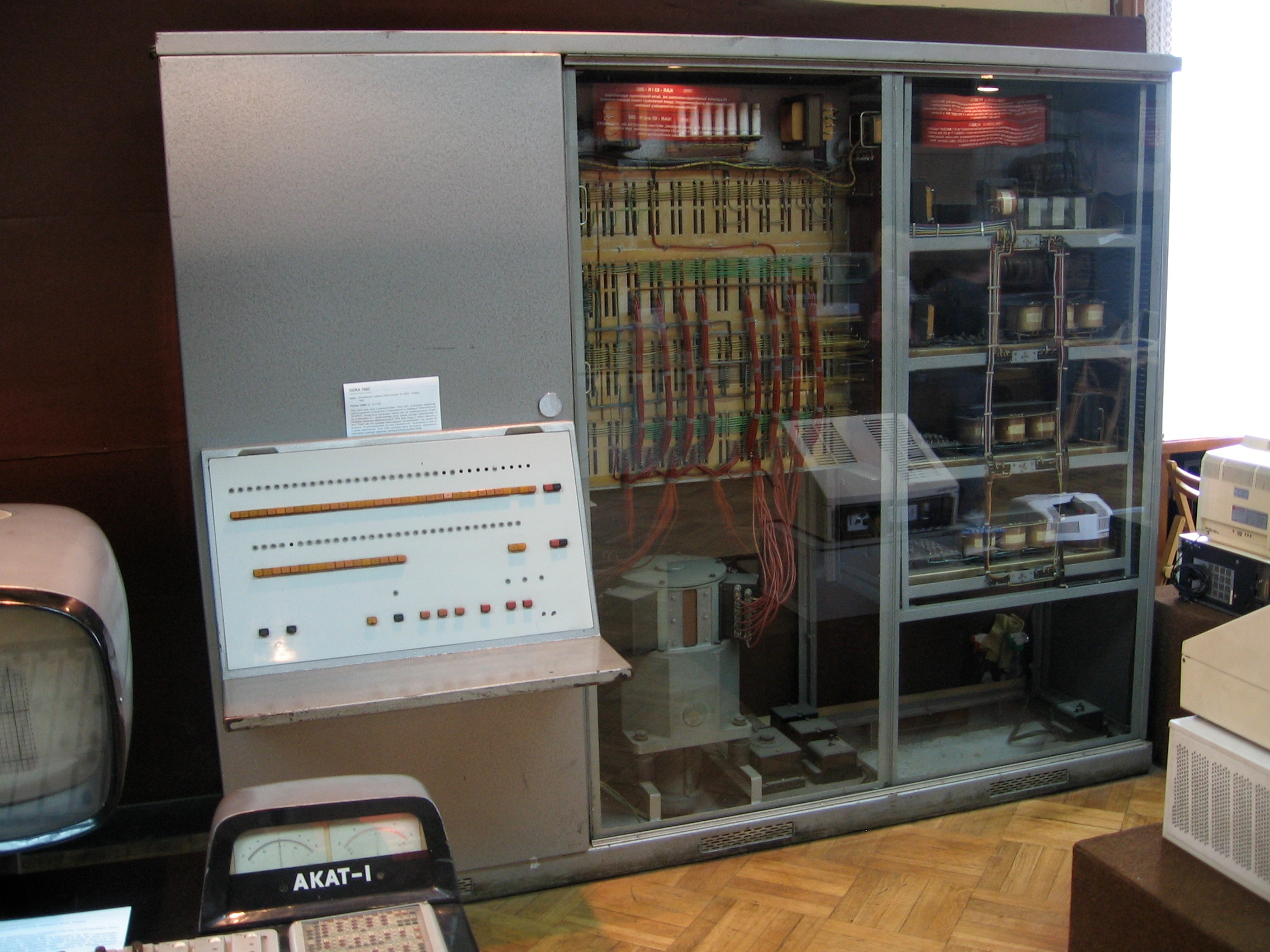
Odra model 1002

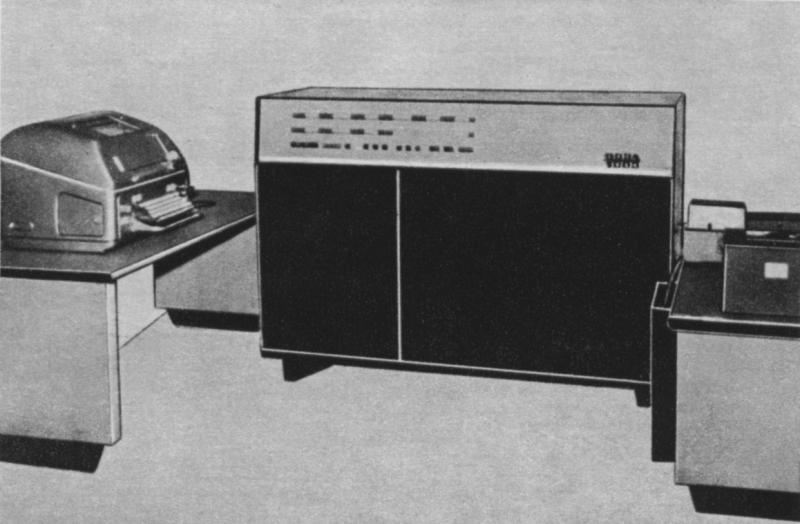
Odra model 1003

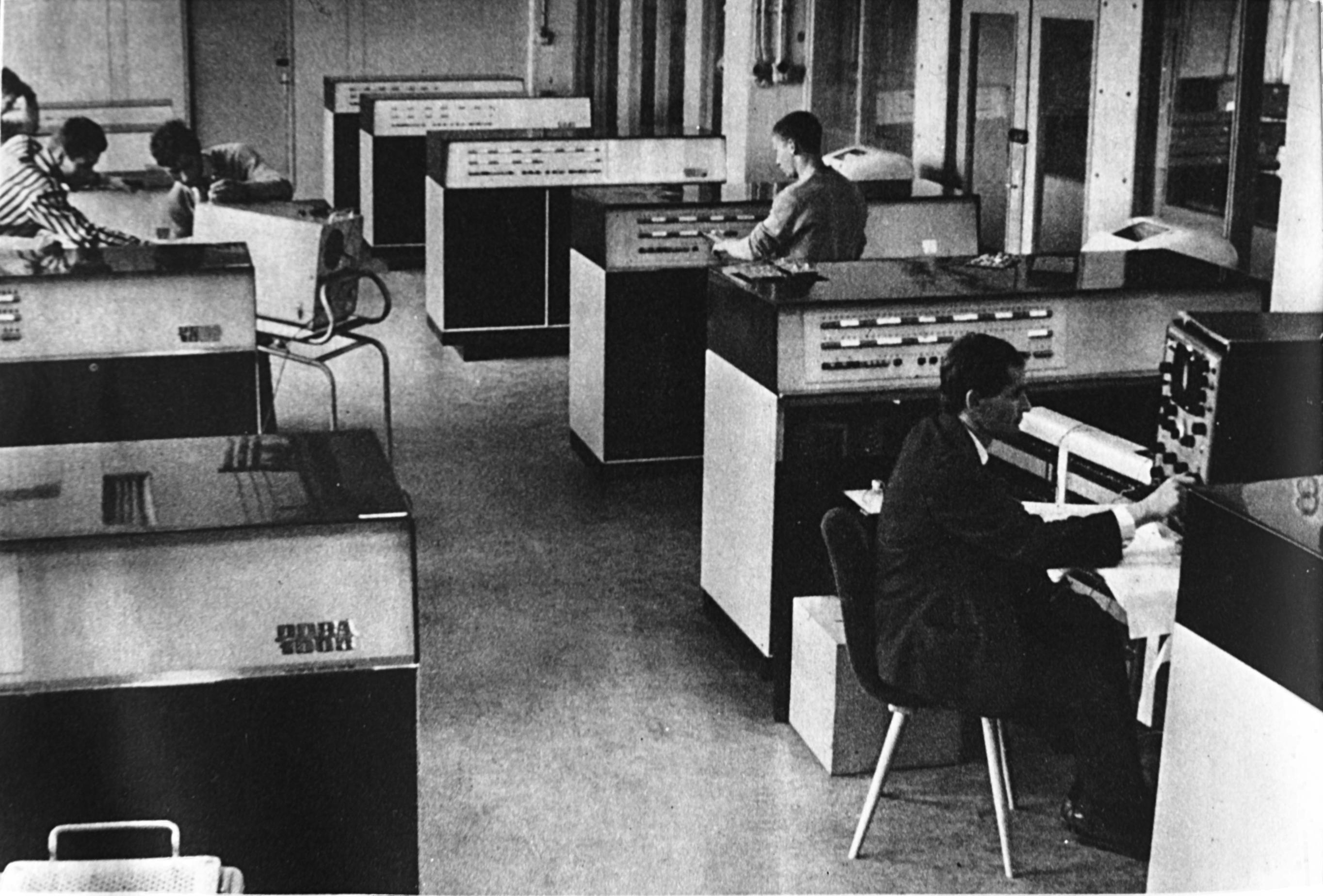
Odra model 1003

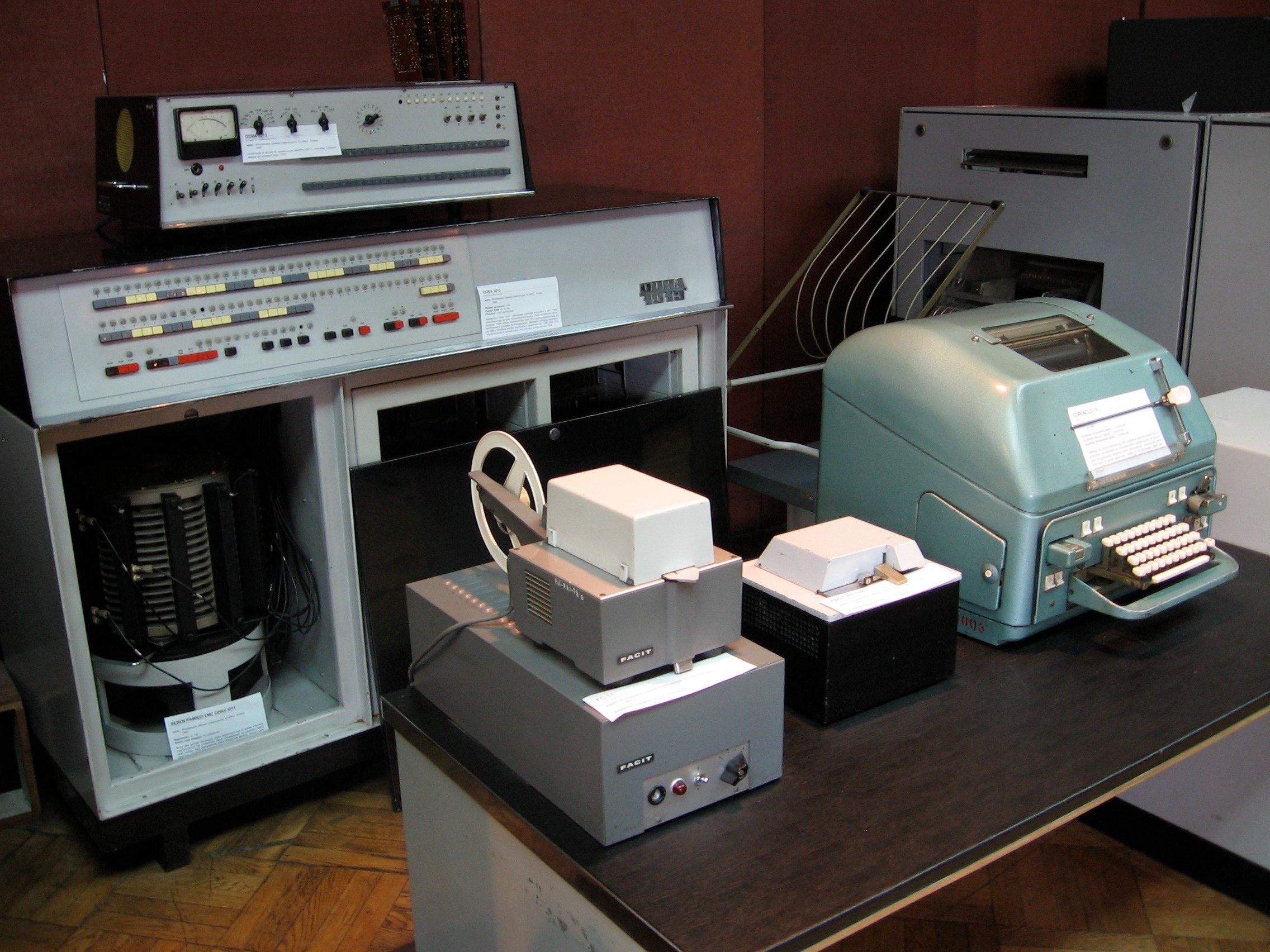
Odra model 1013

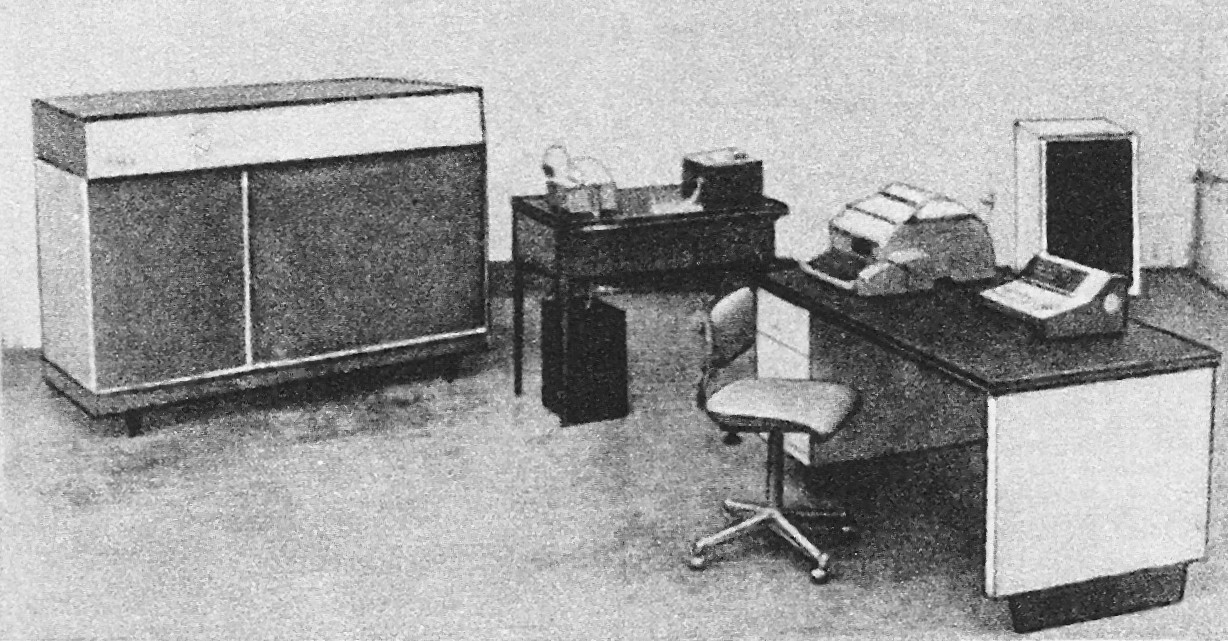
Odra model 1103

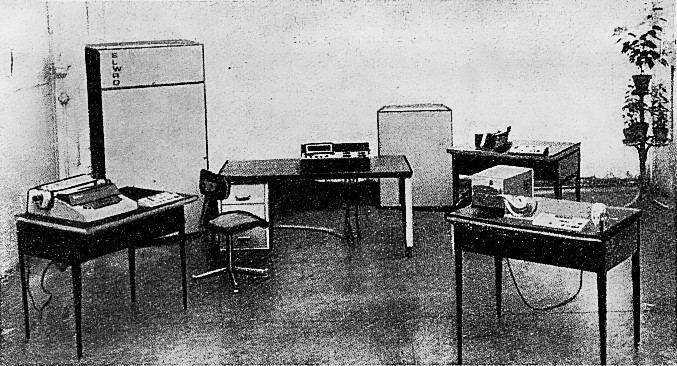
Odra model 1204

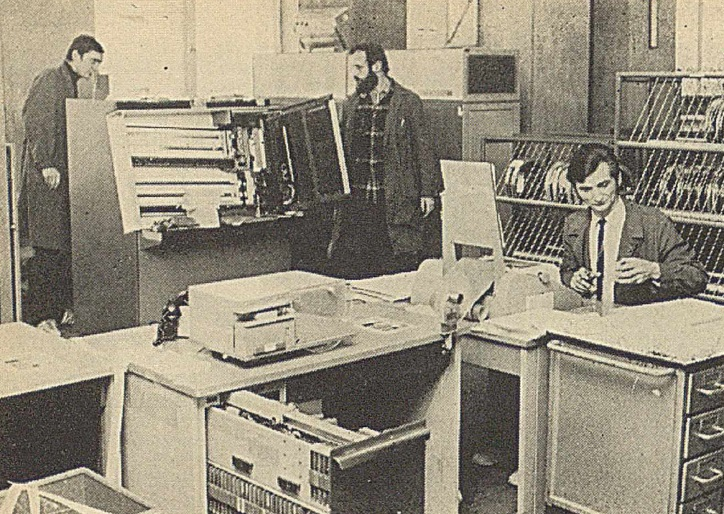
Odra model 1304

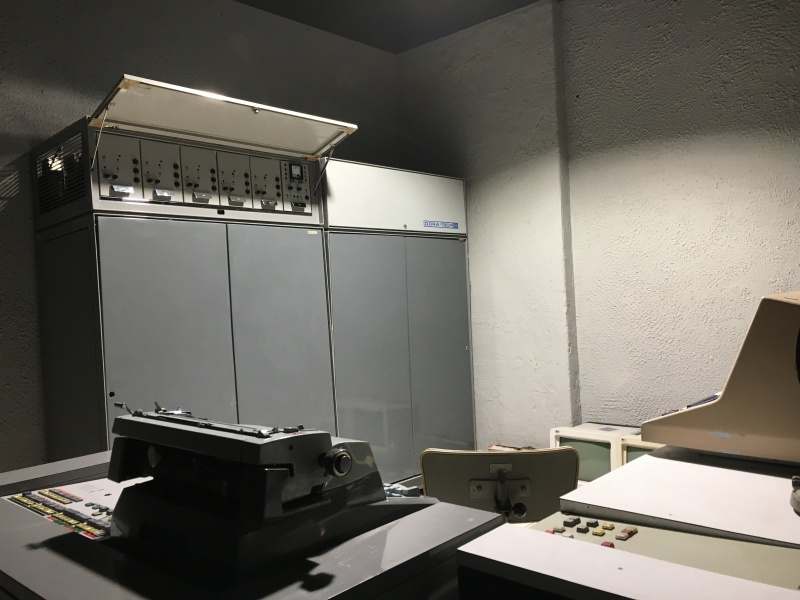
Odra model 1304

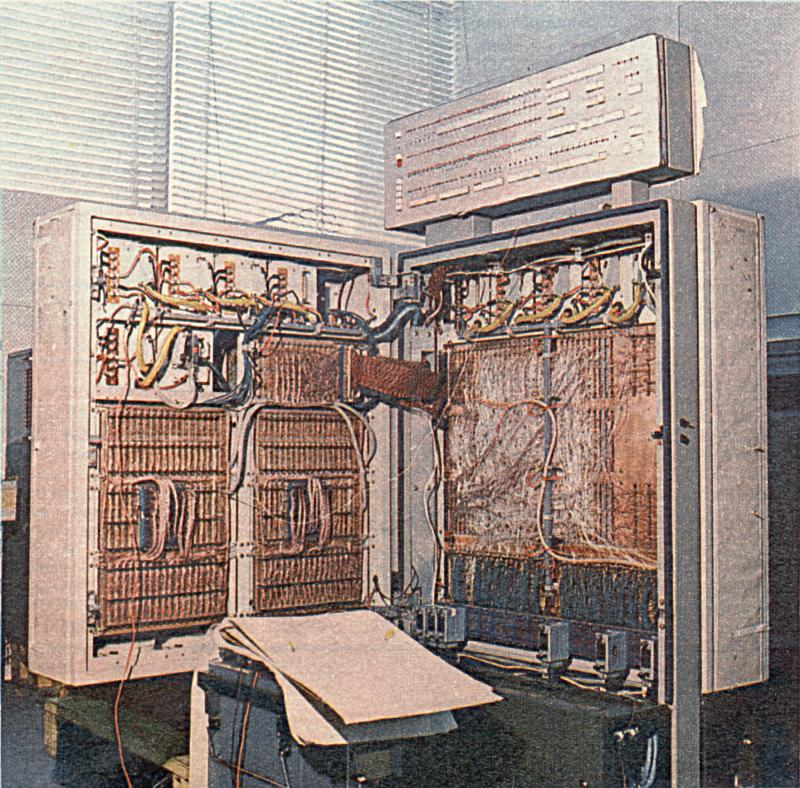
Odra model 1305

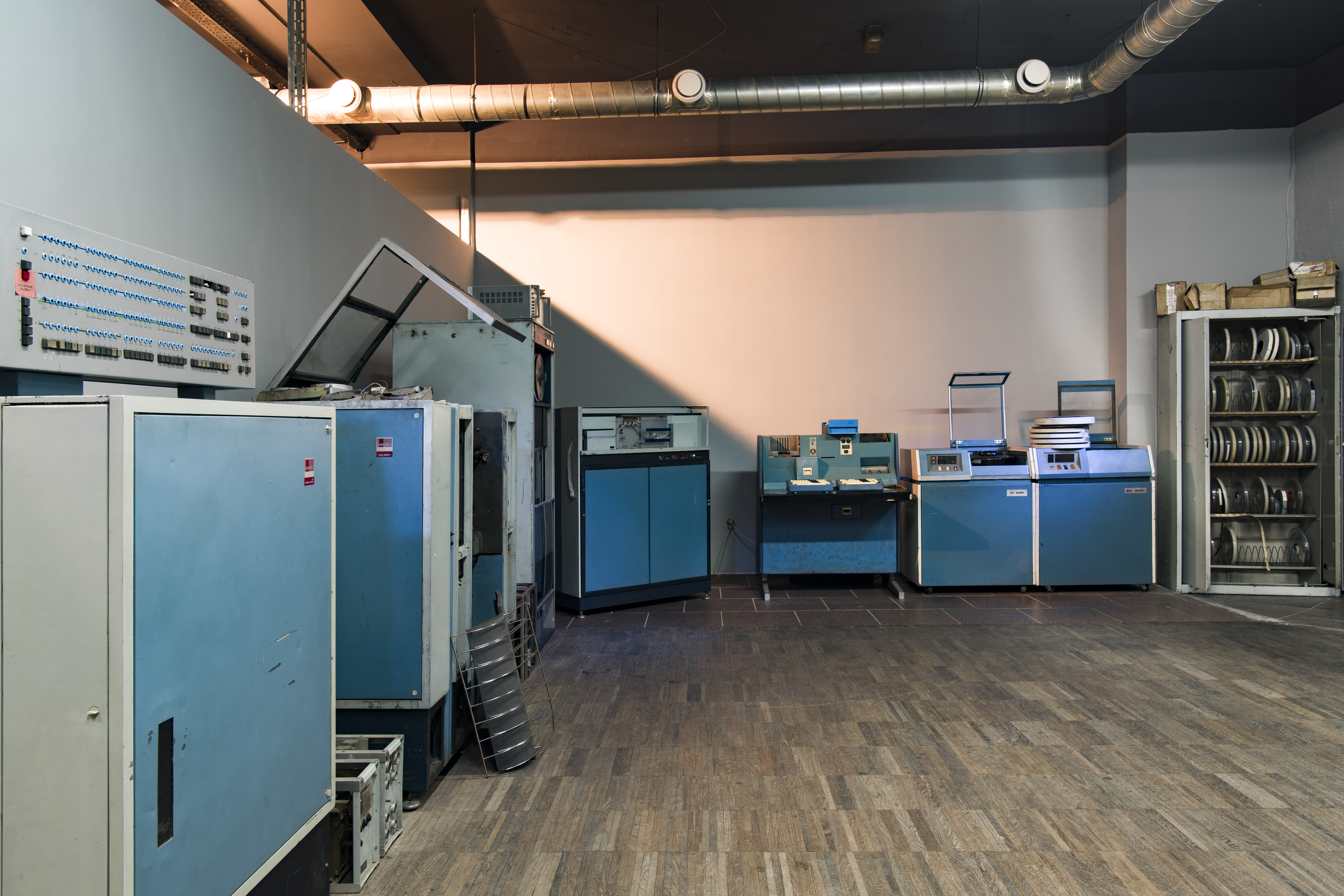
Odra model 1305

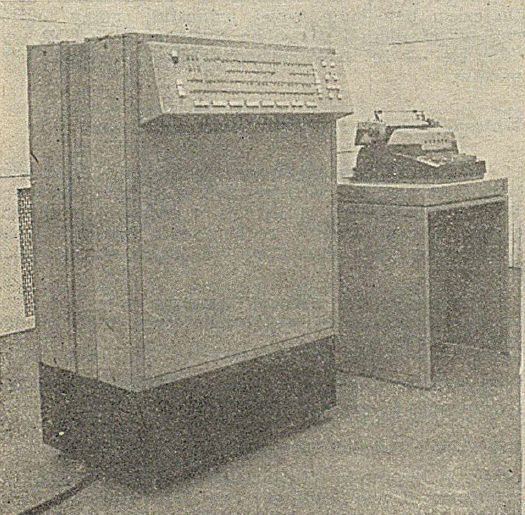
Odra model 1325

== Literature ==
- Bronisław Obirek (1970). Maszyny analityczne organizacja zmechanizowanego obrachunku. Wydawnictwo Naukowo Techniczne, Warsaw.

== See also ==
- History of computing in Poland
- History of computer hardware in Eastern Bloc countries
