= Church of St Mary and St Nicholas, Wilton =

Parish church in Wilton, England

Church of St Mary and St Nicholas
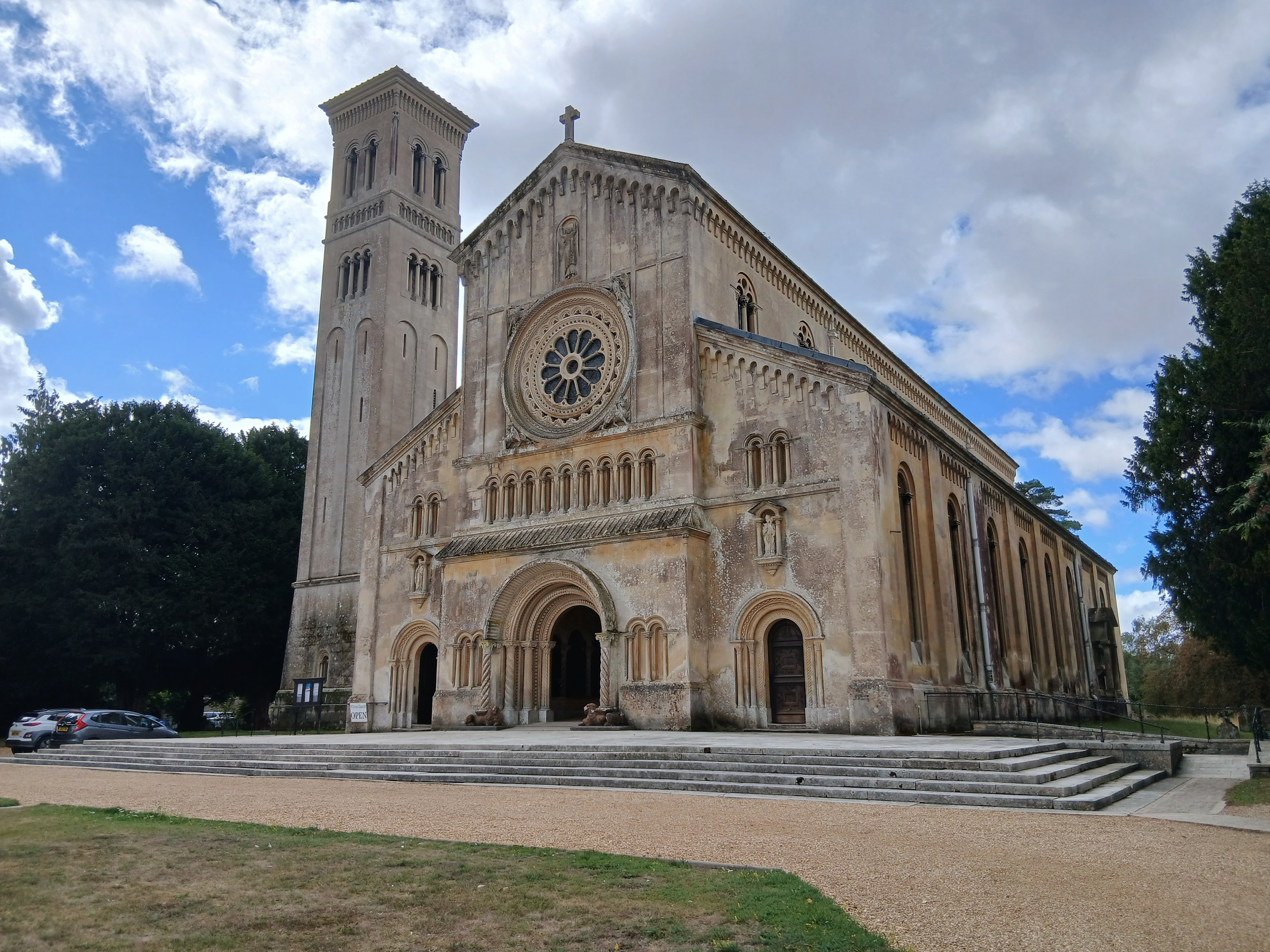
- Eastern facade
- Church of St Mary and St Nicholas
- 51.0809°N 1.8660°W
- Denomination: Anglican

History
- Consecrated: 9 October 1845

Architecture
- Architect(s): Thomas Henry Wyatt and David Brandon
- Architectural type: Romanesque Revival
- Years built: 1841–1844
- Construction cost: £20,000

Listed Building – Grade I
- Official name: Church of St Mary and St Nicholas
- Designated: 4 August 1951
- Reference no.: 1365914

The Church of St Mary and St Nicholas is a Grade I listed parish church in Wilton, Wiltshire, England. Notable for its Italianate Romanesque style, the building is a departure from the traditional English Gothic architecture of the mid-19th century. It was commissioned by the Herbert family of nearby Wilton House.

== History ==
By the early 19th century, the original medieval parish church of St Mary, in the centre of Wilton’s market square, had fallen into a state of severe disrepair. Rather than restoring the old structure, Sidney Herbert (later 1st Baron Herbert of Lea) and his mother, the Countess of Pembroke, decided to fund a new building on a fresh site at the town's edge. The church was designed by architect Thomas Henry Wyatt and his partner David Brandon. Construction began in 1841 and was completed in 1844, at a then-staggering cost of approximately £20,000, partly on the site of a previous medieval church of St Nicholas. It was consecrated by the Bishop of Salisbury on 9 October 1845.

The church was designated as Grade I listed in 1951.

== Architecture ==
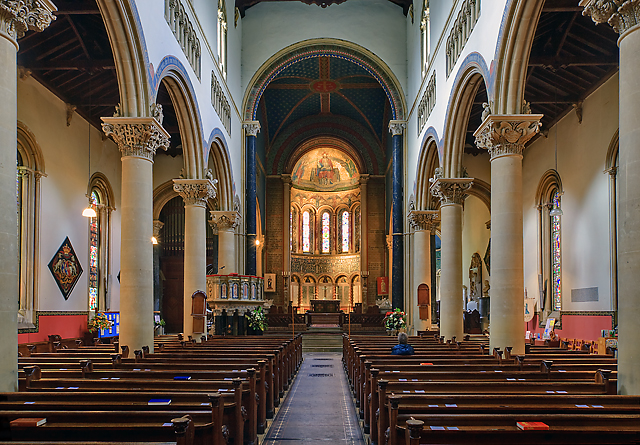
The nave

=== Exterior ===
Built using material imported from continental Europe, the church reflects the Romanesque Revival. It is mostly influenced by the Northern Italian region and partly based on the Church of San Pietro and Maria. Built of ashlar with slate roofs, the building's plan follows a triparitite western facade characterised by Lombard arcading, a central rose window with a tetramorph, and a recessed main portal with four decorated orders resting on stone lions, a reference to churchs in Tuscania. Its most prominent feature is the campanile, which stands 33 metres (108 ft) tall. Unlike traditional English church towers, it is almost entirely detached.

=== Interior ===
Architect Thomas Henry Wyatt utilized a Roman basilica plan to house an collection of continental antiquities, most notably the Capocci Shrine with its 13th-century twisted marble columns from Rome and a 17th-century pear-wood door from the Low Countries. The visual climax of the space is the chancel's semi-circular apse, which glows with gilded mosaics by Gertrude Martin, interspersing biblical scenes with geometric patterns. The architecture blends these imported treasures with local history, including a 16th-century memorial to John Coffer, the man who famously greeted Elizabeth I at Wilton House, and an eclectic font featuring components from three centuries. The church also features a collection of stained glass from the 12th–16th centuries from France (St. Denis and St. Chappelle), Switzerland and Germany, as well as modern editions from Harry Stammers. Marble columns from the southern end of the side aisle came from the Temple of Venus, dated 2nd century B.C., in Porto Venere.

== Gallery ==
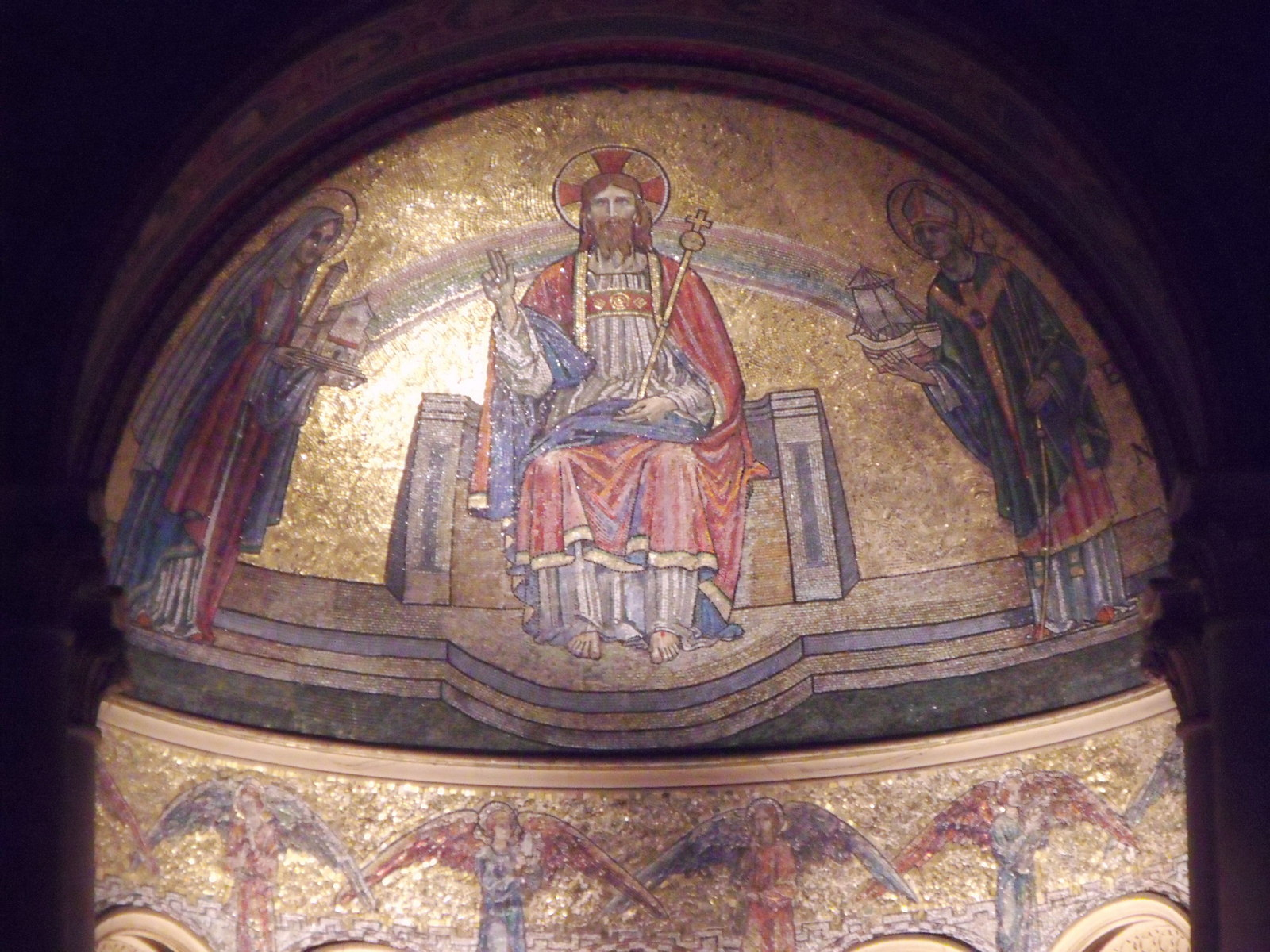
Pantocrator

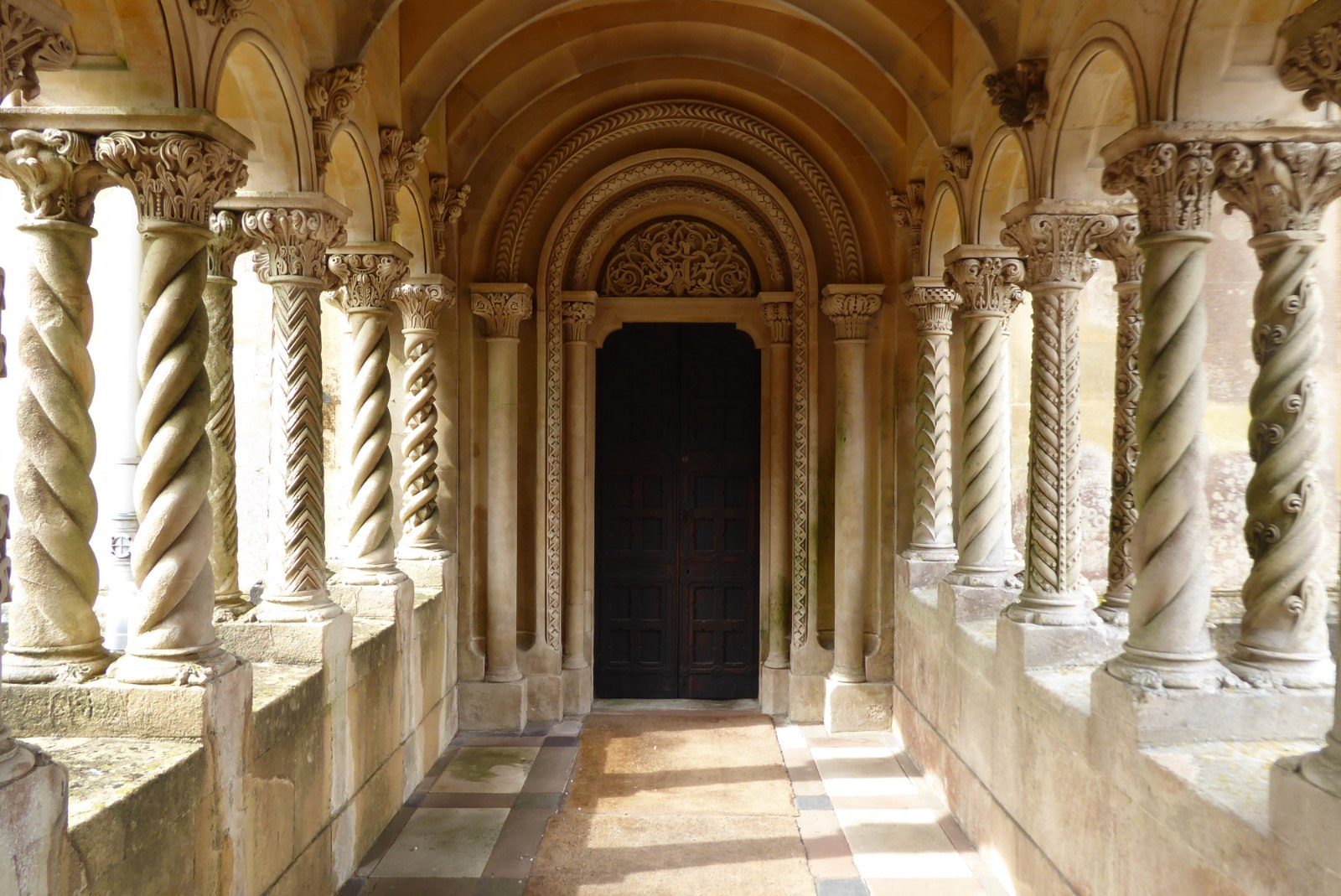
Church's cloisters

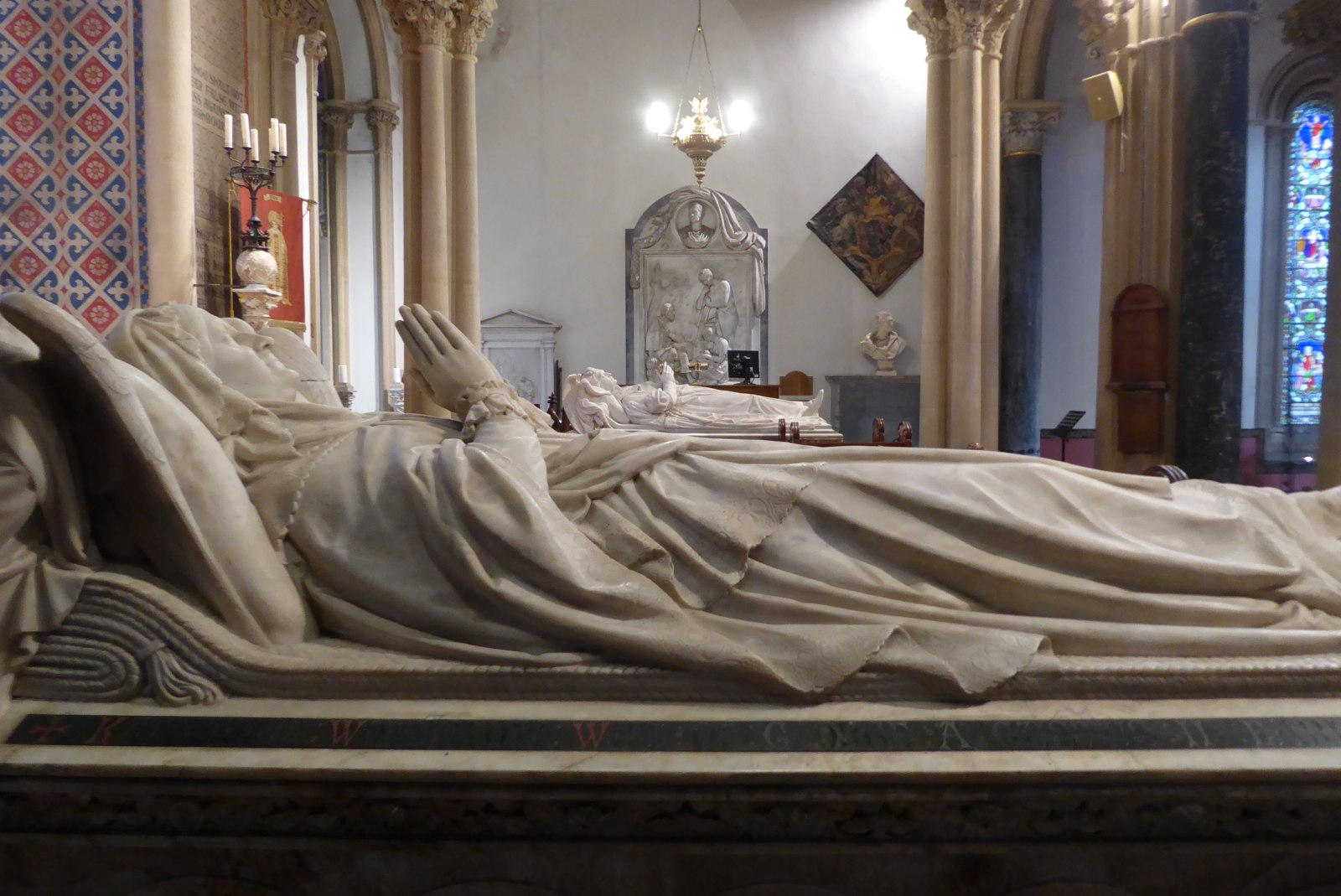
Memorial effigies

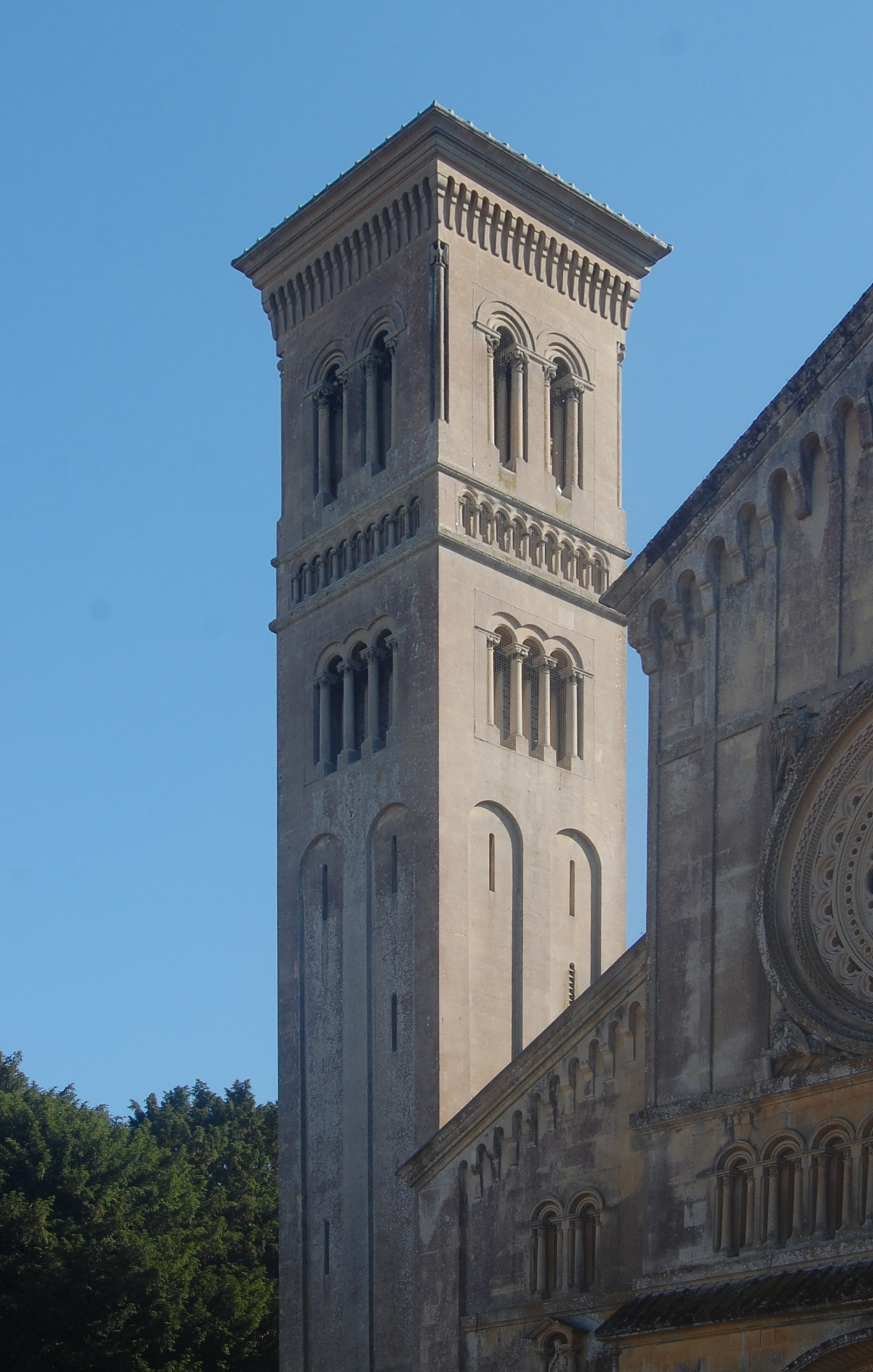
Bell tower

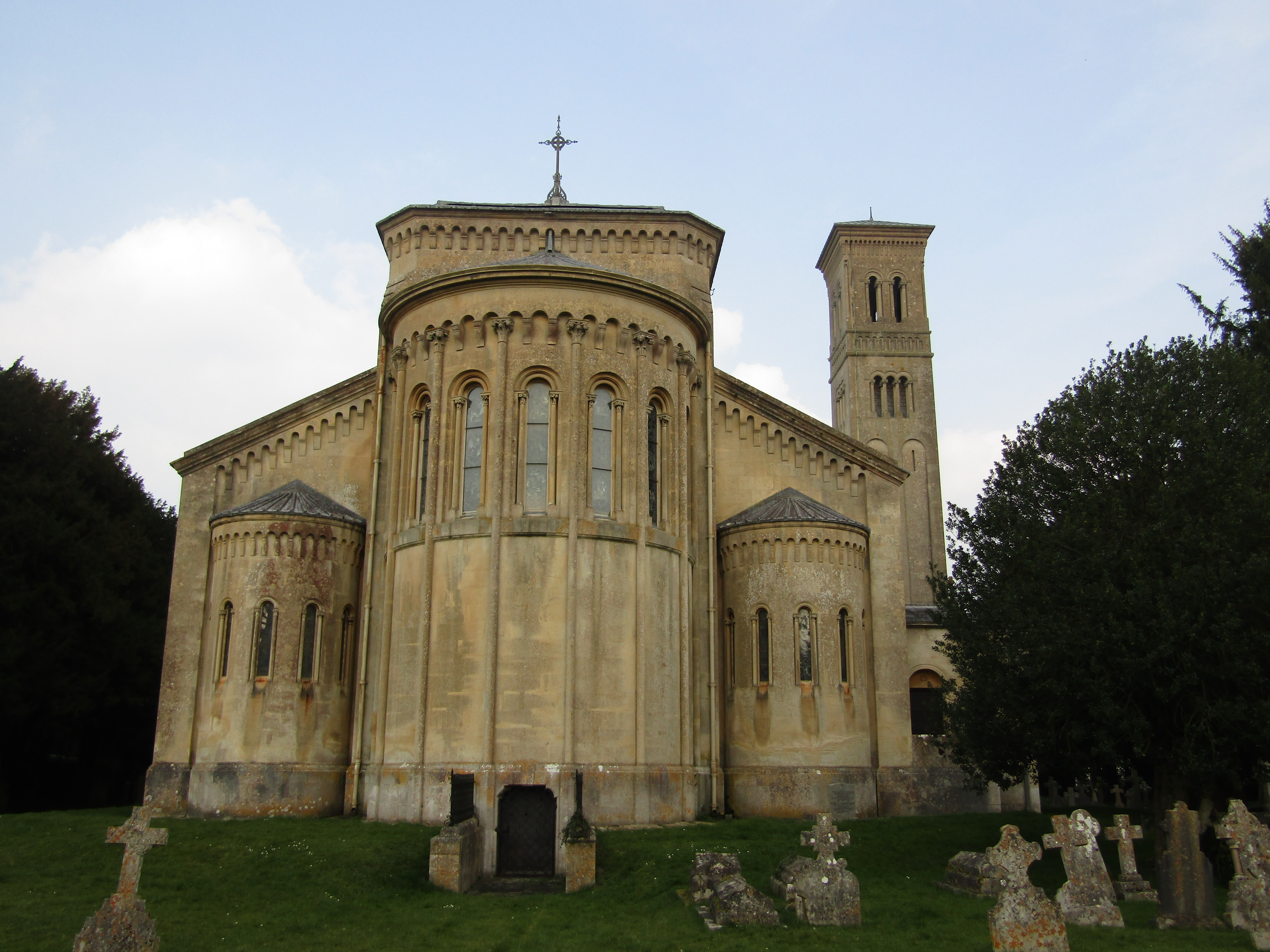
Western facade

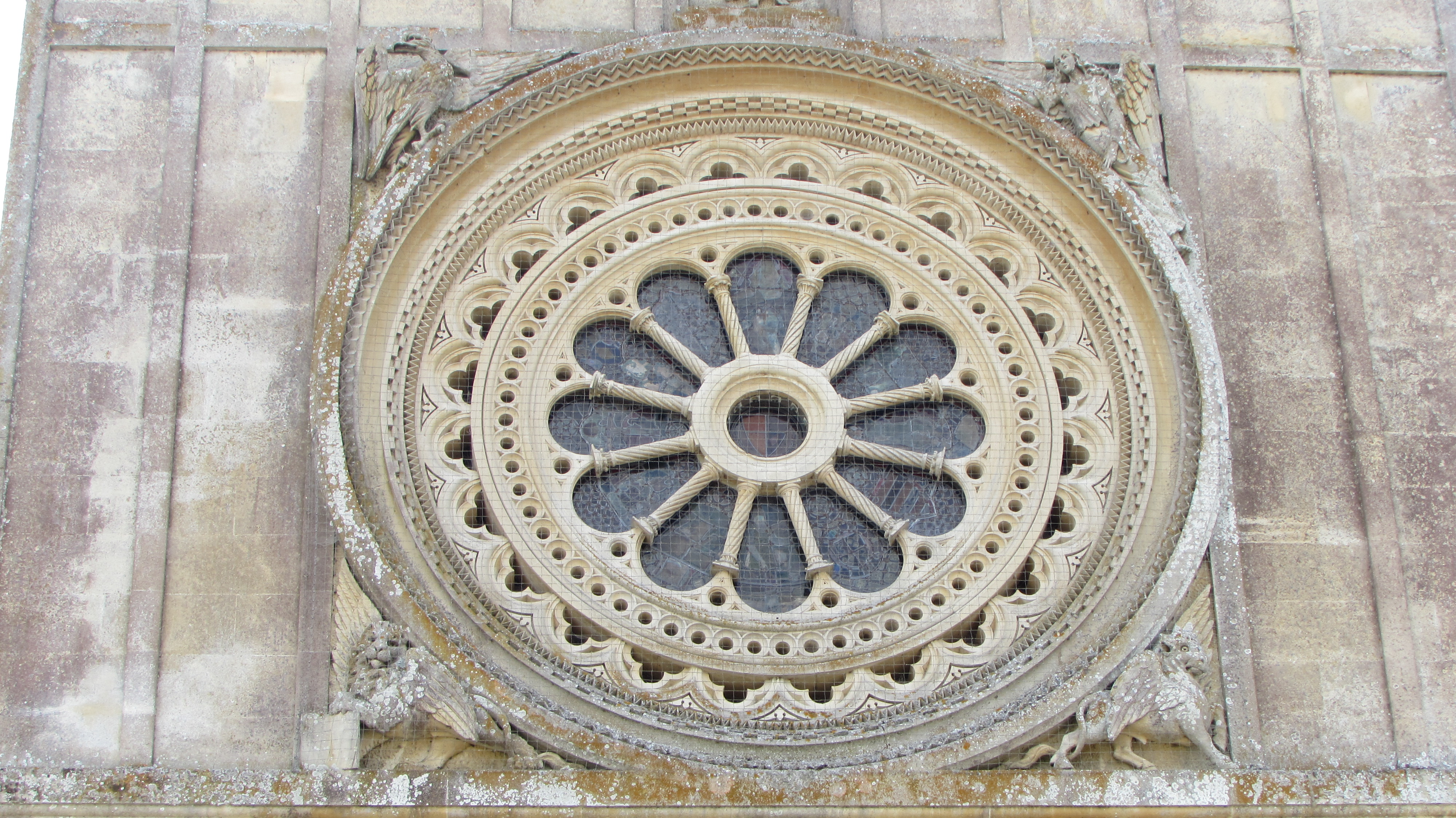
Rose window

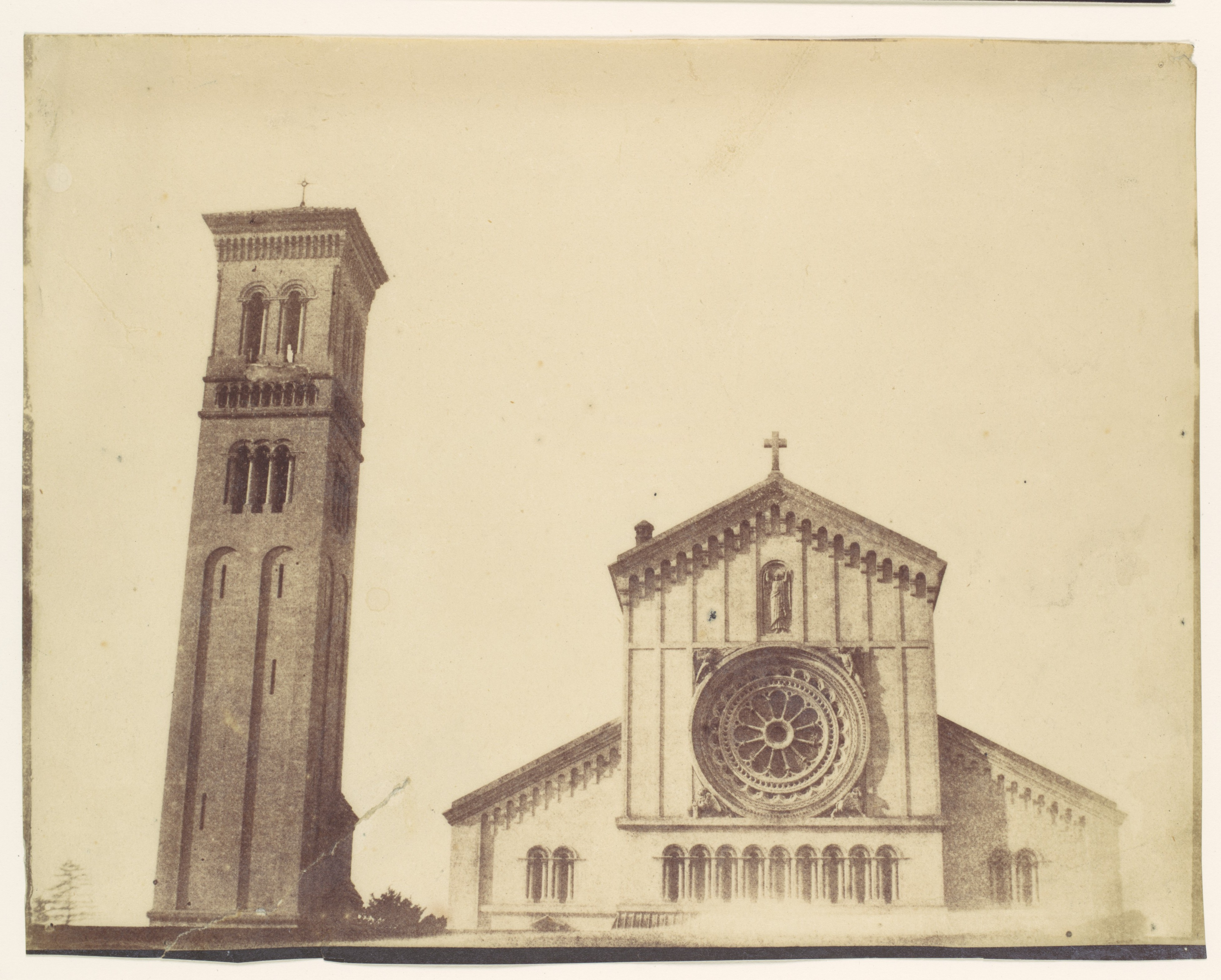
Photograph of the church in the 1850s
