= Etruscan numerals =

Words, phrases and symbols for numbers of the Etruscan language

Etruscan numerals are the words and phrases for numbers of the Etruscan language, and the numerical digits used to write them.

== Digits ==
The Etruscan numerical system included the following digits with known values:

Digit					
Unicode	𐌠	𐌡	𐌢	𐌣	
Value	1	5	10	50	100

(With the proper Unicode font installed, the first two rows should look the same.)

Examples are known of larger numbers, but it is unknown which digit represents which numeral. Most numbers were written with "additive notation", namely by writing digits that added to the desired number, from higher to lower value. Thus the number '87', for example, would be written 50 + 10 + 10 + 10 + 5 + 1 + 1 = "𐌣𐌢𐌢𐌢𐌡𐌠𐌠". (Since the Etruscan script was usually written from right to left, the number would appear as "𐌠𐌠𐌡𐌢𐌢𐌢𐌣" in inscriptions. This caveat holds for all the following examples.)

However, mirroring the way those numbers were spoken in their language, the Etruscans would often write 17, 18, and 19 as "𐌠𐌠𐌠𐌢𐌢", "𐌠𐌠𐌢𐌢", and "𐌠𐌢𐌢" – that is, "three from twenty", "two from twenty", and "one from twenty", instead of "𐌢𐌡𐌠𐌠", "𐌢𐌡𐌠𐌠𐌠", and "𐌢𐌡𐌠𐌠𐌠𐌠". (The Romans occasionally did the same for 18 and 19, matching the way they said those numbers: duodeviginti and undeviginti. This habit has been attributed to Etruscan influence in the Latin language.)

The same pattern was used for 27, 28, 29, 37, 38, 39, etc. In contrast, the Etruscans generally wrote "𐌠𐌠𐌠𐌠" for 4 (alone and in 14, 24, 34, etc.), "𐌢𐌢𐌢𐌢" for 40, and "𐌡𐌠𐌠", "𐌡𐌠𐌠𐌠", "𐌡𐌠𐌠𐌠𐌠" for 7, 8, and 9 alone. (In that they were unlike the Romans, who would write 4 as "IV", 9 as "IX", 40 as "XL".)

These digits were used throughout the Etruscan zone of influence, from the plains of northern Italy to the region of modern Naples, south of Rome. However, it should be kept in mind that there is in fact very little surviving evidence of these numerals.

The Etruscan digits for 1, 5, 10, 50, and 100 ("𐌠", "𐌡", "𐌢", "𐌣", and "𐌟") have been assigned specific codes in the Unicode computer character set, as part of the Old Italic block.

=== Origins ===
The Etruscan digits may have been based on the Greek Attic numerals. However, other hypotheses have been advanced.

==== Hand signals ====
An old hypothesis, advanced by Th. Mommsen in 1887 and echoed by A. Hooper, is that the digits for 1, 5, and 10 were iconic for hand gestures for counting.

In that hypothesis, the early inhabitants of the region counted from 1 to 4 by extending the same number of long fingers (index to little); gestures that were represented in writing by "𐌠", "𐌠𐌠", "𐌠𐌠𐌠", "𐌠𐌠𐌠𐌠". The count of 5 was signaled by extending those 4 fingers plus the thumb; and the written digit "𐌡" is then meant to depict that hand, with the thumb out to the side. The numbers 6 to 9 then would be signaled by one fully open hand and 1 to 4 long fingers extended in the other; which would be depicted as "𐌡𐌠", "𐌡𐌠𐌠", "𐌡𐌠𐌠𐌠", "𐌡𐌠𐌠𐌠𐌠". Finally 10 would be signaled by two hands with all fingers and thumbs extended; which, in writing, would be represented by the upper and lower halves of the digit "𐌢".

==== Tally marks ====
Another hypothesis, which seems to be more accepted today, is that the Etrusco-Roman numerals actually derive from notches on tally sticks, which continued to be used by Italian and Dalmatian shepherds into the 19th century. Unfortunately, being made of perishable wood, no tally sticks would have survived from that period.

In that system, each unit counted would be recorded as a notch cut across the stick. Every fifth notch was double cut, i.e. "𐌡" and every tenth was cross cut, "𐌢"; much like European tally marks today. For example, a count of '28' would then look like

𐌠𐌠𐌠𐌠𐌡𐌠𐌠𐌠𐌠𐌢𐌠𐌠𐌠𐌠𐌡𐌠𐌠𐌠𐌠𐌢𐌠𐌠𐌠𐌠𐌡𐌠𐌠𐌠

When transposing the final count to writing (or to another stick), it would have been unnecessary to copy each "𐌠𐌠𐌠𐌠Λ𐌠𐌠𐌠𐌠" before a "𐌢", or each "𐌠𐌠𐌠𐌠" before a Λ. So the count of '28' would be written down as simply "𐌢𐌢𐌡𐌠𐌠𐌠".

== Number words ==
The paucity of material severely limits current knowledge about the Etruscan words for numbers, and their grammar. For example, the assumed word for 9, nurφ, is known from a single inscription.

Nevertheless, except for the identities of 4 and 6, there is general agreement among Etruscologists about the words for numbers up to 100. The table below gives the transliteration (one letter for each Etruscan letter) and an approximate phonetic pronunciation.

Words marked by asterisks are not attested, but are hypothesized based on known numbers. A hyphen indicates that only derivations of the numeral are attested.

Etruscan numerals
Value	Decimal interpretation	Duodecimal interpretation
1	θu [tʰu] ~ θun ~ tu ~ tun	
2	zal [t͡sal]	
3	ci [ki] ~ ki (~ ψi?)	
4	śa [ʃa] ~ sa or huθ [hutʰ] ~ hut	huθ [hutʰ] ~ hut
5	maψ [makʰ] ~ *maψv-	
6	huθ [hutʰ] ~ hut or śa [ʃa] ~ sa	śa [ʃa] ~ sa
7	śemφ [ʃempʰ]	
8	*cezp [ket͡sp]	
9	nurφ- [nurpʰ]	
10	śar [ʃar] ~ zar [t͡sar]	halψ [halkʰ]
11	*θuśar [tʰuʃar] "one-ten"	?
12	*zalśar [t͡salʃar] "two-ten"	śar [ʃar] ~ zar [t͡sar] "twelve"
13	ci- śar- [kiʃar] "three-ten"	*θuśar?
14	*śaśar [ʃaʃar] or huθzar [hutʰt͡sar] "four-ten"	*zalśar?
15	*maψśar [makʰʃar] "five-ten"	ci- śar- "three-twelve"
16	huθzar- [hutʰt͡sar] or *śaśar [ʃaʃar] "six-ten"	huθzar- [hutʰt͡sar] "four-twelve"
17	ciem zaθrum [ki-em t͡satʰum] "three from twenty"	
18	eslem zaθrum [esl-em t͡satʰum] "two from twenty"	
19	θunem zaθrum [tʰun-em t͡satʰum] "one from twenty"	
20	zaθrum [t͡satʰrum] "tw-?"	
30	cealψ [t͡sealkʰ] "three-ty/ten"	
40	śealψ [ʃealkʰ] or *huθalψ [hutʰalkʰ] "four-ty"	*huθalψ- "four-ten"
50	muvalψ [muwalkʰ] "five-ty/ten"	
60	*huθalψ [hutʰalkʰ] or śealψ [ʃealkʰ] "six-ty"	śealψ [ʃealkʰ] "six-ten"
70	śemφalψ [ʃempʰalkʰ] "seven-ty/ten"	
80	cezpalψ [ket͡spalkʰ] "eight-ty/ten"	
90	*nurφalψ [nurpʰalkʰ] "nine-ty/ten"	
100	chimth [ʃimt] or ximth [ʃimt] "one hundred"	

The phonetic notation [pʰ] (φ), [tʰ] (θ) and [kʰ] (ψ) denotes aspirated stops, which in Etruscan are distinguished from non-aspirated [p], [t], [k].

Note that the numbers 17 to 19 are written as three, two and one from twenty. Similarly ciem cealψ "three from thirty" (27) etc.

The numbers could be inflected for case. For example, in the Etruscan sentence lupu avils esals cezpalψals "has died [at the age] of two eighty", esals is the genitive of zal (2) and cezpalψals is the genitive of cezpalψ (80).

=== The 4 vs. 6 dispute ===
There has been a longstanding controversy about the assignment of 4 and 6. All Etruscologists agree that the words are huθ (hut^{h}) and śa (sha). The disagreement is about which is which.

Until recently, it was generally accepted, based on archaeological evidence, that 4 was huθ and 6 was śa. For instance, in the frescos of the Tomb of the Charuns in the Monterozzi necropolis, on a hill east of Tarquinia, four Charons are represented, each one accompanied by an inscription: Next to the fourth Charon, the text reads charun huths ("the fourth Charon"). In the same necropolis, in the Tomb of the Anina, which contains six burial places, an inscription reads: sa suthi cherichunce, which has been translated as: "he built six tombs/sepulchres".

However, that assignment was challenged in 2011 by a thorough analysis of 91 Etruscan gambling dice, from many different ages and locations, with numbers marked by dots ("pips"); and a lone pair of dice (the "Tuscanian dice" or "dice of Toscanella") with the numbers written out as words.

Mathematically, there are 30 ways to place the numbers 1–6 on the faces of a die; or 15 if one counts together numberings that are mirror images of each other. These 15 possibilities are identified by the pairs of numbers that occur on opposite faces:

(1–2, 3–4, 5–6), (1–2, 3–5, 4–6), (1–2, 3–6, 4–5),
(1–3, 2–4, 5–6), (1–3, 2–5, 4–6), (1–3, 2–6, 4–5),
(1–4, 2–3, 5–6), (1–4, 2–5, 3–6), (1–4, 2–6, 3–5),
(1–5, 2–3, 4–6), (1–5, 2–4, 3–6), (1–5, 2–6, 3–4),
(1–6, 2–3, 4–5), (1–6, 2–4, 3–5), (1–6, 2–5, 3–4)

For unknown reasons, Roman dice generally used the last pattern, (1–6, 2–5, 3–4), in which every pair of opposite faces adds to 7; a tradition that continued in Europe to the present day, and has become the standard all over the world. However, among the 91 Etruscan dice from many different locations, those from 500 BCE or earlier used only the first pattern, (1–2, 3–4, 5–6), in which the opposite faces differ by 1. Those from 350 BCE and later, on the other hand, used the Roman (1–6, 2–5, 3–4) pattern. Between 500 and 350 BCE, the latter gradually replaced the former at all Etruscan sites covered.

On the Tuscany dice, the opposite faces carry the words (θu–huθ, zal–maψ, ci-śa). In both the "old" and "new" patterns, however, the values 3 and 4 lie on opposite faces. Thus, since ci was known to be 3, the researchers concluded that śa must be 4; and since there is no dissent about the words for 1, 2, and 5, huθ had to be 6.

That assignment would imply that the Tuscany dice follow the pattern (1–6, 2–5, 3–4); that is, they are of the "late" (Roman) type. The researchers claim that this assignment is consistent with the shape of the letters, that indicate a date later than 400 BCE.

The opposite assignment (4 = huθ, 6 = śa) would make the pattern of the Tuscany dice be (1–4, 2–5, 3–6); that is, with numbers on opposite faces being 3 apart. No other Etruscan die has been found with that pattern (or with words instead of pips, for that matter).

=== Duodecimal hypothesis ===
In 2006, S. A. Yatsemirsky presented evidence that zar or śar meant '12' (cf. zal '2' and zaθrum '20') while halψ meant '10'. According to his interpretation, the attested form huθzar could only mean 'sixteen', and huθ must therefore mean 'four'. The form śealψ would therefore be '60', and is presumably cognate with Lemnian sialψv-eiś '60'.

=== Indo-European hypothesis ===
There is a debate that has been carried out about a possible Indo-European origin of the Etruscan number words.

L. Bonfante (1990) claimed that what the numerals "show, beyond any shadow of a doubt, is the non-Indo-European nature of the Etruscan language".

Conversely, other scholars, including F. Adrados, A. Carnoy, M. Durante, V. Georgiev, A. Morandi and M. Pittau, have posited a "perfect fit" between the ten Etruscan numerals and words in various Indo-European languages (not always numerical or with any apparent connection), such as θu 'one' and Sanskrit tvad 'thou', zal 'two' and German zwei 'two', ci 'three' and Iranian sih 'three' (from proto-Indo-European *tréyes, which is not a match to Etruscan [ki]), huθ 'four' and Latin quattuor 'four', etc.

== See also ==
- Etruscan civilization
- Etruscan language
- Old Italic alphabet
