= Church of Santa Maria Maggiore (Cerveteri) =

Church building in Cerveteri, Italy

Church of Santa Maria Maggiore(Cerveteri)
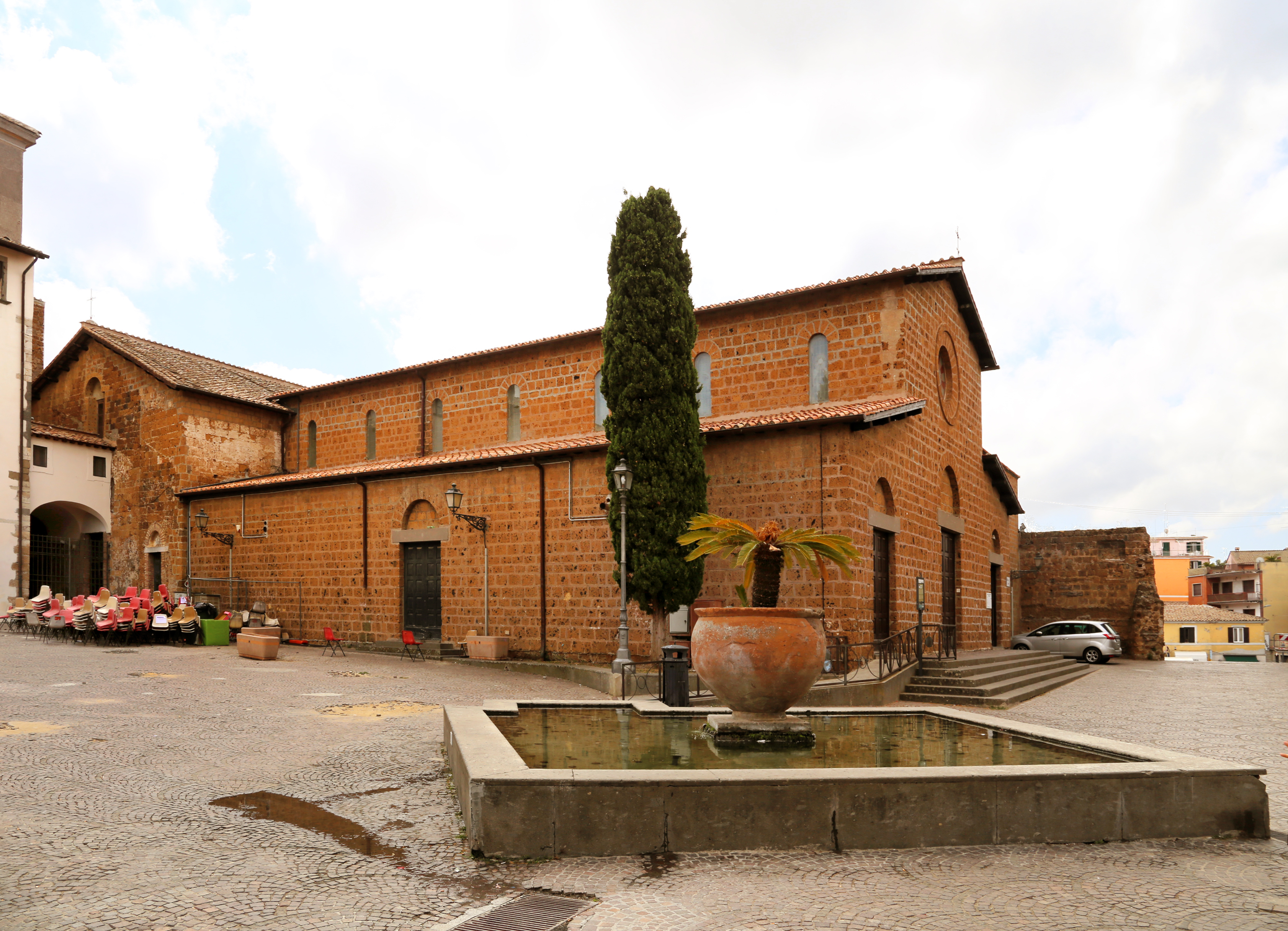

Religion
- Affiliation: Roman Catholic
- Year consecrated: 1000 ca. the first one, 1959 the second one

Location
- Location: Cerveteri, Italy
- Interactive map of Church of Santa Maria Maggiore(Cerveteri)

Architecture
- Groundbreaking: 1000 ca. the first one, 1950 the second one
- Completed: 1000 ca. the first one, 1959 the second one

Website
- Parrocchia Santa Maria Maggiore

The church of Santa Maria Maggiore is the main church of Cerveteri. It includes an ancient church and a new church, linked together.

It was originally built in the 700s, and was rebuilt c1100; it is the oldest cathedral in Tuscania.

The church contains a Pietà which is believed to have been created by Perin del Vaga.

== See also ==
Santa Maria Maggiore, Tuscania
