= Campanari =

Campanari is an Italian surname. Notable people with the surname include:

- Francesco Campanari (1555–1632), Italian Roman Catholic prelate
- Giuseppe Campanari (1855–1927), Italian baritone and cellist
- Leandro Campanari (1859–1939), Italian violinist, conductor, composer and music teacher
