= Ancient Greek Numbers (Unicode block) =

- Range: U+10140..U+1018F (80 code points)
- Plane: SMP
- Scripts: Greek
- Symbol sets: acrophonic numerals
- Assigned: 79 code points
- Unused: 1 reserved code points

Unicode version history
- 4.1 (2005): 75 (+75)
- 7.0 (2014): 77 (+2)
- 9.0 (2016): 79 (+2)

Unicode documentation
- Code chart ∣ Web page

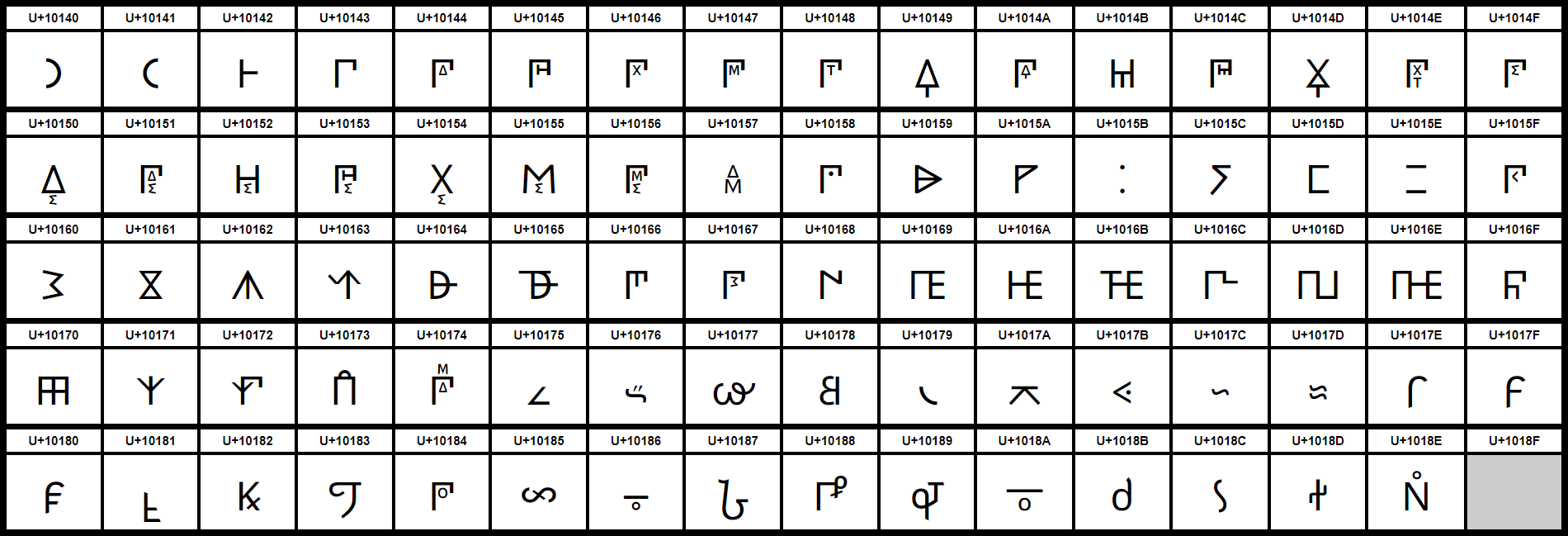
Graphical representation of the Ancient Greek Numbers Unicode block

Ancient Greek Numbers is a Unicode block containing acrophonic numerals used in ancient Greece, including ligatures and special symbols.

== Block ==
Ancient Greek Numbers^{[1]}^{[2]} Official Unicode Consortium code chart (PDF)
	0	1	2	3	4	5	6	7	8	9	A	B	C	D	E	F
U+1014x	𐅀	𐅁	𐅂	𐅃	𐅄	𐅅	𐅆	𐅇	𐅈	𐅉	𐅊	𐅋	𐅌	𐅍	𐅎	𐅏
U+1015x	𐅐	𐅑	𐅒	𐅓	𐅔	𐅕	𐅖	𐅗	𐅘	𐅙	𐅚	𐅛	𐅜	𐅝	𐅞	𐅟
U+1016x	𐅠	𐅡	𐅢	𐅣	𐅤	𐅥	𐅦	𐅧	𐅨	𐅩	𐅪	𐅫	𐅬	𐅭	𐅮	𐅯
U+1017x	𐅰	𐅱	𐅲	𐅳	𐅴	𐅵	𐅶	𐅷	𐅸	𐅹	𐅺	𐅻	𐅼	𐅽	𐅾	𐅿
U+1018x	𐆀	𐆁	𐆂	𐆃	𐆄	𐆅	𐆆	𐆇	𐆈	𐆉	𐆊	𐆋	𐆌	𐆍	𐆎	
Notes: 1. As of Unicode version 17.0; 2. Grey area indicates non-assigned code point

== History ==
The following Unicode-related documents record the purpose and process of defining specific characters in the Ancient Greek Numbers block:

Version	Final code points (Note: Proposed code points and characters names may differ from final code points and names)	Count	L2 ID	WG2 ID	Document
4.1	U+10140..10189	74	L2/01-412		Anderson, Deborah (2001-11-05), Greek Acrophonic Numerals Proposal and Proposals for Other Greek Additional Characters
4.1	U+10140..10189	74	L2/01-405R		Moore, Lisa (2001-12-12), "Consensus 89-C9", Minutes from the UTC/L2 meeting in Mountain View, November 6-9, 2001, "The UTC favors the addition of the remaining Greek acrophonic numerals rather than cloning the existing Greek letters."
4.1	U+10140..10189	74	L2/02-029		Anderson, Deborah (2002-01-21), Measures Unicode Proposal
4.1	U+10140..10189	74	L2/02-031		Anderson, Deborah (2002-01-21), TLG Miscellanea Proposal
4.1	U+10140..10189	74	L2/02-033		Anderson, Deborah (2002-01-21), TLG Unicode Proposal (draft)
4.1	U+10140..10189	74	L2/02-053		Anderson, Deborah (2002-02-04), Description of TLG Documents
4.1	U+10140..10189	74	L2/02-273		Pantelia, Maria (2002-07-31), TLG Unicode Proposal
4.1	U+10140..10189	74	L2/02-287		Pantelia, Maria (2002-08-09), Proposal Summary Form accompanying TLG Unicode Proposal (L2/02-273)
4.1	U+10140..10189	74	L2/02-318R		Pantelia, Maria (2002-11-07), Proposal for encoding Greek numerical characters in the UCS
4.1	U+10140..10189	74	L2/03-075R3	N2612-3	Pantelia, Maria (2003-06-11), Proposal for encoding Greek acrophonic characters in the UCS
4.1	U+10140..10189	74	L2/03-158R	N2612-2	Pantelia, Maria (2003-06-11), Proposal for encoding Greek numerical characters in the UCS
4.1	U+1018A	1	L2/04-054	N2708	Mercier, Raymond (2004-02-02), Proposal to encode Greek Zero in the UCS
7.0	U+1018B..1018C	2	L2/12-034	N4194	Sosin, Joshua; Heilporn, Paul; Hoogendijk, Cisca; Mastronarde, Donald; Hickey, Todd; Anderson, Deborah (2012-01-23), Proposal for three Greek papyrological characters
7.0	U+1018B..1018C	2	L2/12-007		Moore, Lisa (2012-02-14), "C.12", UTC #130 / L2 #227 Minutes
7.0	U+1018B..1018C	2		N4253 (pdf, doc)	"M59.16f", Unconfirmed minutes of WG 2 meeting 59, 2012-09-12
9.0	U+1018D	1	L2/14-156	N4596	Kalvesmaki, Joel (2014-07-18), Proposal to encode GREEK BYZANTINE INDICTION SIGN
9.0	U+1018D	1	L2/14-170		Anderson, Deborah; Whistler, Ken; McGowan, Rick; Pournader, Roozbeh; Iancu, Laurențiu (2014-07-28), "8", Recommendations to UTC #140 August 2014 on Script Proposals
9.0	U+1018D	1	L2/14-177		Moore, Lisa (2014-10-17), "Greek Byzantine Indiction Sign (C.9.1)", UTC #140 Minutes
9.0	U+1018D	1	L2/16-052	N4603 (pdf, doc)	Umamaheswaran, V. S. (2015-09-01), "M63.11t", Unconfirmed minutes of WG 2 meeting 63
9.0	U+1018E	1	L2/14-158	N4594	Kalvesmaki, Joel (2014-07-18), Proposal to encode GREEK BYZANTINE NOMISMA SIGN
9.0	U+1018E	1	L2/14-170		Anderson, Deborah; Whistler, Ken; McGowan, Rick; Pournader, Roozbeh; Iancu, Laurențiu (2014-07-28), "10", Recommendations to UTC #140 August 2014 on Script Proposals
9.0	U+1018E	1	L2/14-177		Moore, Lisa (2014-10-17), "Nomisma Sign (C.9.3)", UTC #140 Minutes
9.0	U+1018E	1	L2/16-052	N4603 (pdf, doc)	Umamaheswaran, V. S. (2015-09-01), "M63.11r", Unconfirmed minutes of WG 2 meeting 63
