= Attic numerals =

Symbolic number notation used by the ancient Greeks

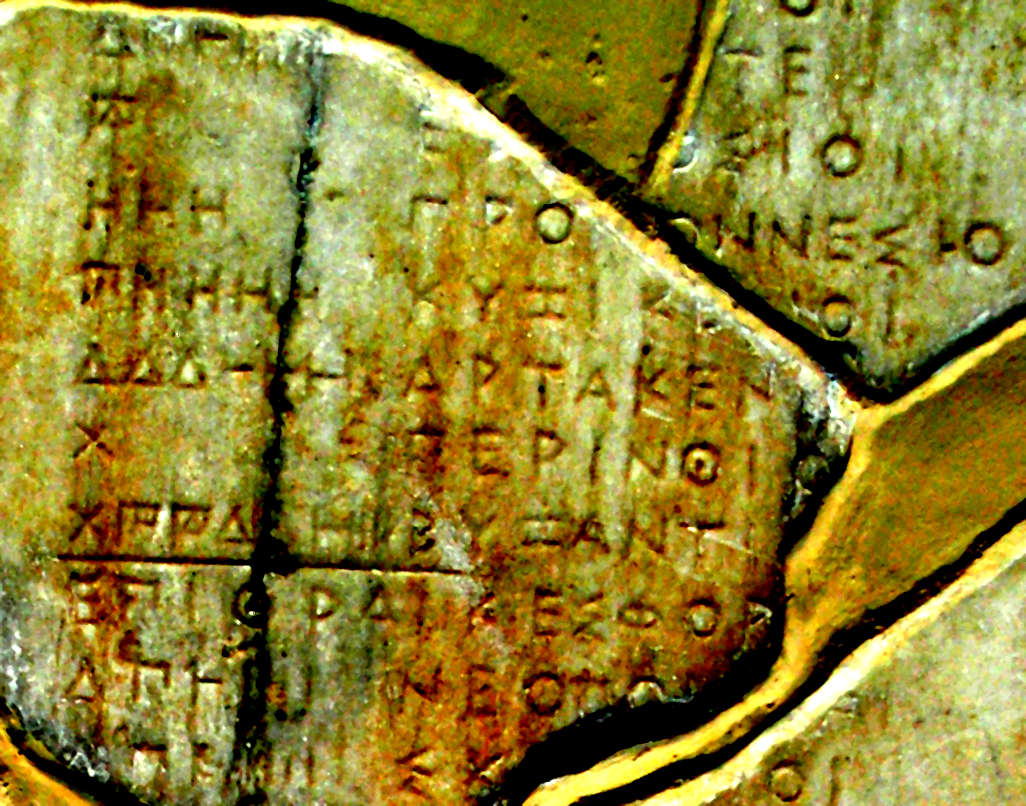
Detail of stela showing tributes paid by allies of Athens in the League of Delos. The amounts are in Attic numerals, using the drachma sign "𐅂" instead of the generic unit sign "Ι". Some amounts are "𐅄" = 50, "ΗΗΗ" = 300, "𐅅ΗΗΗ" = 800, "ΔΔΔ𐅂𐅂𐅂" = 33, "Χ" = 1000, and "Χ𐅅𐅄Δ𐅂𐅂"? = 1562?.

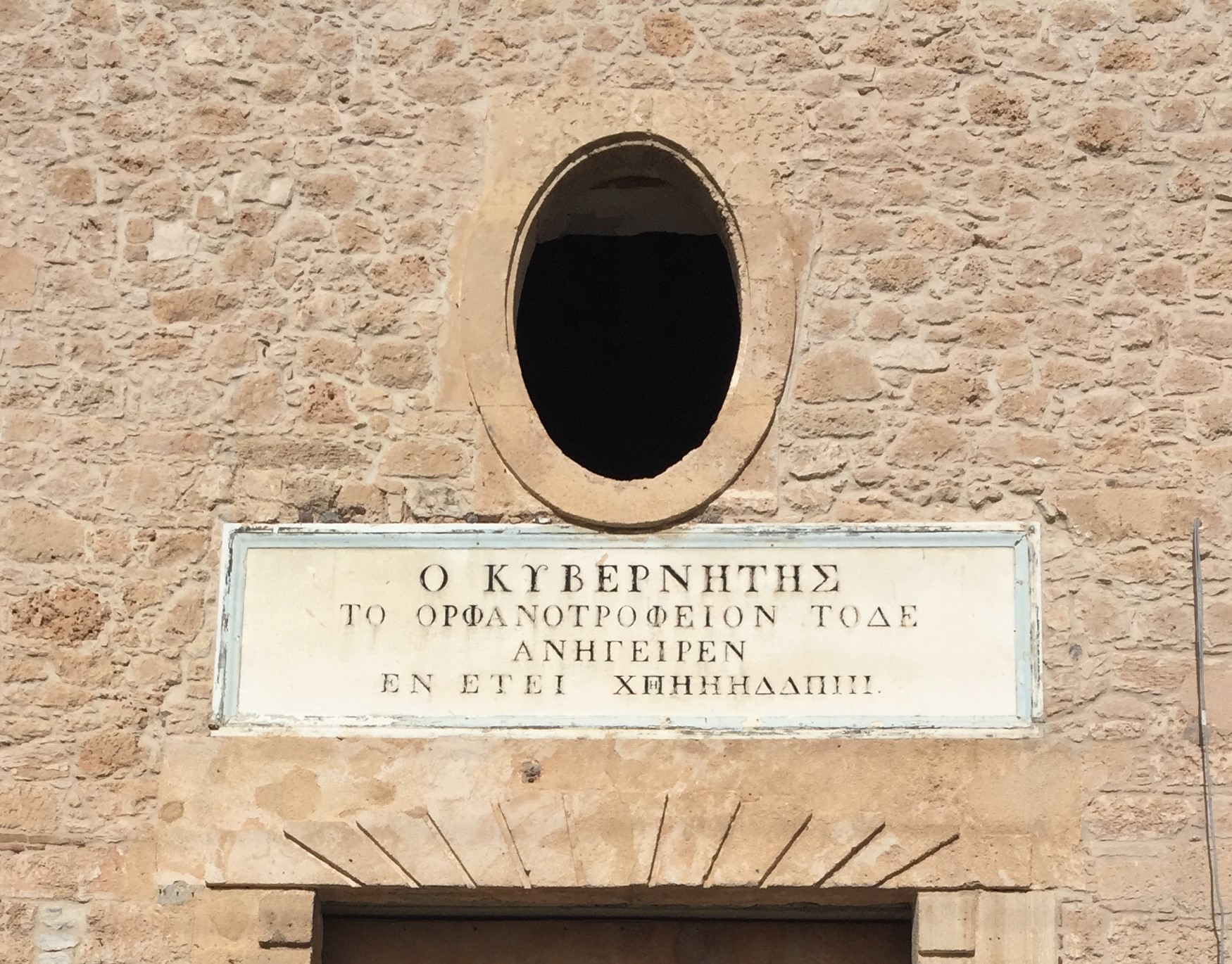
Plaque above the main entrance to the orphanage, which later became a prison, on the Greek island of Aegina. The ancient Greek inscription translates as “The Governor erected this orphanage in the year 1828”. The year is shown as Χ𐅅ΗΗΗΔΔ𐅃ΙΙΙ.

The Attic numerals are a symbolic number notation used by the ancient Greeks. They were also known as Herodianic numerals because they were first described in a 2nd-century manuscript by Herodian; or as acrophonic numerals (from acrophony) because the basic symbols derive from the first letters of the (ancient) Greek words that the symbols represented.

The Attic numerals were a decimal system, like the older Egyptian and the later Etruscan, Roman, and Hindu-Arabic systems. Namely, the number to be represented was broken down into simple multiples (1 to 9) of powers of ten — units, tens, hundred, thousands, etc.. Then these parts were written down in sequence, in order of decreasing value. As in the basic Roman system, each part was written down using a combination of two symbols, representing one and five times that power of ten.

Attic numerals were adopted possibly starting in the 7th century BCE and although presently called Attic, they or variations thereof were universally used by the Greeks. No other numeral system is known to have been used on Attic inscriptions before the Common Era. Their replacement by the classic Greek numerals started in other parts of the Greek World around the 3rd century BCE. They are believed to have served as model for the Etruscan number system, although the two were nearly contemporary and the symbols are not obviously related.

== The system ==
=== Symbols ===
The Attic numerals used the following main symbols, with the given values:

Value	Symbol	Talents	Staters	Notes	Etruscan	Roman
1	Ι			Tally mark?	𐌠	I
5	𐅃	𐅈	𐅏	Old Greek: ΠΕΝΤΕ [pɛntɛ] Modern: πέντε	𐌡	V
10	Δ	𐅉	𐅐	Old Greek: ΔΕΚΑ [deka] Modern: δέκα	𐌢	X
50	𐅄	𐅊	𐅑	"Δ" in "𐅃": 10 × 5 = 50	𐌣	L
100	Η	𐅋	𐅒	Old Greek: ΗΕΚΑΤΟΝ [hɛkaton] Modern: εκατό	𐌟	C
500	𐅅	𐅌	𐅓	"Η" in "𐅃": 100 × 5 = 500	?	D
1000	Χ	𐅍	𐅔	Old Greek: ΧΙΛΙΟΙ [kʰilioi] Modern: χίλιοι	?	M
5000	𐅆	𐅎		"Χ" in "𐅃": 1000 × 5 = 5000	?	V̅
10000	Μ		𐅕	Old Greek: ΜΥΡΙΟΙ [myrioi] Modern: μύριοι	?	X̅
50000	𐅇		𐅖	"Μ" in "𐅃": 10000 × 5 = 50000	?	L̅

The symbols representing 50, 500, 5000, and 50000 were composites of five (an old form of the capital letter pi with a short right leg) and a tiny version of the applicable power of ten. For example, 𐅆 was five times one thousand.

==== Special symbols ====
The fractions "one half" and "one quarter" were written "𐅁" and "𐅀", respectively.

The symbols were slightly modified when used to encode amounts in talents (with a small capital tau, "Τ") or in staters (with a small capital sigma, "Σ"). Specific numeral symbols were used to represent one drachma ("𐅂") and ten minas "𐅗".

==== The symbol for 100 ====
The use of "Η" (capital eta) for 100 reflects the early date of this numbering system. In the Greek language of the time, the word for a hundred would be pronounced [hɛkaton] (with a "rough aspirated" sound /h/) and written "ΗΕΚΑΤΟΝ", because "Η" represented the sound /h/ in the Attic alphabet. In later, "classical" Greek, with the adoption of the Ionic alphabet throughout the majority of Greece, the letter eta had come to represent the long e sound while the rough aspiration was no longer marked. It was not until Aristophanes of Byzantium introduced the various accent markings during the Hellenistic period that the spiritus asper began to represent /h/, resulting in the spelling ἑκατόν.

=== Simple multiples of powers of ten ===
Multiples 1 to 9 of each power of ten were written by combining the two corresponding "1" and "5" digits, namely:

Units	Ι	II	III	IIII	𐅃	𐅃I	𐅃II	𐅃III	𐅃IIII
Units	1	2	3	4	5	6	7	8	9
Tens	Δ	ΔΔ	ΔΔΔ	ΔΔΔΔ	𐅄	𐅄Δ	𐅄ΔΔ	𐅄ΔΔΔ	𐅄ΔΔΔΔ
Tens	10	20	30	40	50	60	70	80	90
Hundreds	Η	ΗΗ	ΗΗΗ	ΗΗΗΗ	𐅅	𐅅Η	𐅅ΗΗ	𐅅ΗΗΗ	𐅅ΗΗΗΗ
Hundreds	100	200	300	400	500	600	700	800	900
Thousands	Χ	ΧΧ	ΧΧΧ	ΧΧΧΧ	𐅆	𐅆Χ	𐅆ΧΧ	𐅆ΧΧΧ	𐅆ΧΧΧΧ
Thousands	1000	2000	3000	4000	5000	6000	7000	8000	9000
Tens of thousands	Μ	ΜΜ	ΜΜΜ	ΜΜΜΜ	𐅇	𐅇Μ	𐅇ΜΜ	𐅇ΜΜΜ	𐅇ΜΜΜΜ
Tens of thousands	10000	20000	30000	40000	50000	60000	70000	80000	90000

Unlike the more familiar Roman numeral system, the Attic system used only the so-called "additive" notation. Thus, the numbers 4 and 9 were written ΙΙΙΙ and 𐅃ΙΙΙΙ, not Ι𐅃 and ΙΔ.

=== General numbers ===
In general, the number to be represented was broken down into simple multiples (1 to 9) of powers of ten — units, tens, hundred, thousands, etc.. Then these parts would be written down in sequence, from largest to smallest value. For example:

- 49 = 40 + 9 = ΔΔΔΔ + 𐅃ΙΙΙΙ = ΔΔΔΔ𐅃ΙΙΙΙ
- 2001 = 2000 + 1 = ΧΧ + I = ΧΧΙ
- 1982 = 1000 + 900 + 80 + 2 = Χ + 𐅅ΗΗΗΗ + 𐅄ΔΔΔ + ΙΙ = Χ𐅅ΗΗΗΗ𐅄ΔΔΔΙΙ
- 62708 = 60000 + 2000 + 700 + 8 = 𐅇Μ + ΧΧ + 𐅅ΗΗ + 𐅃ΙΙΙ = 𐅇ΜΧΧ𐅅ΗΗ𐅃ΙΙΙ.

== Unicode ==
Ancient Greek Numbers^{[1]}^{[2]} Official Unicode Consortium code chart (PDF)
	0	1	2	3	4	5	6	7	8	9	A	B	C	D	E	F
U+1014x	𐅀	𐅁	𐅂	𐅃	𐅄	𐅅	𐅆	𐅇	𐅈	𐅉	𐅊	𐅋	𐅌	𐅍	𐅎	𐅏
U+1015x	𐅐	𐅑	𐅒	𐅓	𐅔	𐅕	𐅖	𐅗	𐅘	𐅙	𐅚	𐅛	𐅜	𐅝	𐅞	𐅟
U+1016x	𐅠	𐅡	𐅢	𐅣	𐅤	𐅥	𐅦	𐅧	𐅨	𐅩	𐅪	𐅫	𐅬	𐅭	𐅮	𐅯
U+1017x	𐅰	𐅱	𐅲	𐅳	𐅴	𐅵	𐅶	𐅷	𐅸	𐅹	𐅺	𐅻	𐅼	𐅽	𐅾	𐅿
U+1018x	𐆀	𐆁	𐆂	𐆃	𐆄	𐆅	𐆆	𐆇	𐆈	𐆉	𐆊	𐆋	𐆌	𐆍	𐆎	
Notes 1.As of Unicode version 18.0 2.Grey area indicates non-assigned code point

== See also ==
- Etruscan numerals – Words, phrases and symbols for numbers of the Etruscan language
- Greek mathematics – Mathematics of Ancient Greece and the Mediterranean, 5th BC to 6th AD
- Greek numerals – System of writing numbers using Greek letters
- History of ancient numeral systems
- List of numeral system topics
- List of numeral systems
