= Leandro Campanari =

Italian violinist and conductor (1857–1939)

Leandro Campanari

Leandro Campanari (October 20, 1859 – April 22, 1939) (Note: Although Baker gives his dob as 1857,The New York Times (March 25, 1906) gives his dob. as October 20, 1859, as does the music magazine The Etude (1910). The Etude biographical note is based on a personal interview.) was an Italian violinist, conductor, composer and music teacher, brother of cellist and baritone Giuseppe Campanari.

== Career ==
Leandro Campanari was born in Rovigo, Italy on 20 October 1859. He began studying at a very early age and was sent by the city of Venice to the Musical Institute of Padua when nine years old. At 12 he toured Italy as a violinist prodigy, and to London where he played under Julius Benedict. Later he was associated with Franco Faccio and Antonio Bazzini. At 15, he entered the Conservatory of Music in Milan and studied the violin, harmony, counterpoint and conducting with the most eminent teachers of that institution. He graduated at 19 to go to England with an orchestra, where he had a very successful season. (Note: His fellow-student, Puccini, graduated in the same year (New York Times (Apr.24, 1939))) He then toured Italy and France as a virtuoso before establishing his role as a conductor.

He also taught privately and one of his pupils was the New York violinist Persis Bell, a protégée of Julius Eichberg. They married in 1880.

=== Boston Symphony Orchestra ===
In 1881, he moved to America as a soloist with the Boston Symphony Orchestra, and featured in many concerts throughout the United States. He returned to Europe, but then back to America, where he remained for three years as the head of the Violin School at the New England Conservatory of Music in Boston. He also assumed the direction of the music at the Church of the Immaculate Conception and brought out many important sacred works for the first time in that city.

=== Campanari String Quartet ===
After his service in Boston, Campanari returned to Italy in 1886 and formed the Campanari String Quartet, (Note: Leandro Campanari, I violin; Ercole Ortori, II violin; Guglielmo Andreoli, viola; Gerardo Vollmar, cello. (Instituzione La Casa della Musica, Parma)) which toured with great success for two years. During that time many notable composers, including Puccini, Catalani, Sgambati, Bazzini, Arturo Vanbianchi, Frugatta, Bossi and Guglielmo Andreoli the Younger composed music especially for the Campanari Quartet.

He returned to the United States in 1890 to become professor of violin at the Cincinnati College of Music, succeeding Schradieck, and remained in that position for six years.

Returning to Italy in 1896, he divided his time between Milan, Paris and London. He gave a series of symphony concerts at La Scala, and the cycle of Beethoven symphonies at the Lyric Theatre in Milan. (Note: At one of these concerts Edvard Grieg was in the audience and at the end of the program warmly congratulated Campanari on his direction.) The orchestra then went on tour, meeting with pronounced success. The next important engagement of Campanari and his orchestra was in London, at the Imperial Institute, for a long and very successful season of nearly four months. In Milan he introduced several first performances in Italy of now-famous orchestral works. He also conducted opera in Milan, Venice and Genoa. While in Genoa, he was given the opportunity to play Paganini's violin, Il Cannone Guarnerius. He played Gounod's Ave Maria and Liszt's Campanella.

=== Hammerstein's Opera Company ===
In 1907, he appeared in New York City as one of the opera conductors of Hammerstein's Opera Company. He also conducted the Philadelphia Symphony Orchestra for a short time. With the same organization he appeared in Reading, Trenton, Wilmington, Washington and Baltimore for performances of Beethoven's "Ninth Symphony". He also conducted in Los Angeles and San Francisco. Owing to the serious illness of his wife, Persis Bell, an American lady and once a violinist of note, Campanari removed to California, but after her recovery, he resumed his work as a virtuoso and a conductor.

=== Campanari and Verdi ===
Leandro Campanari's acquaintance with Verdi extended over a period of many years. As a youth he played in an orchestra conducted by the composer, and Verdi's last work was first given under the direction of Campanari. The conductor's brother, Umberto Campanari, a lawyer, was one of the executors of the estate of Verdi. Leandro wrote an intimate piece about his relationship with the master for The Etude (1910).

=== Pedagogy ===
Campanari moved to San Francisco in 1907, where he became director of the California Conservatory of Music. He taught both violin and voice.

=== Works ===
Campanari composed many English songs and three text-books for violin playing.

Campanari died in San Francisco in 1939. He is buried in Mountain View Cemetery, Oakland, California.
