= Gertrude Martin =

British mosaicist (1881–1952)

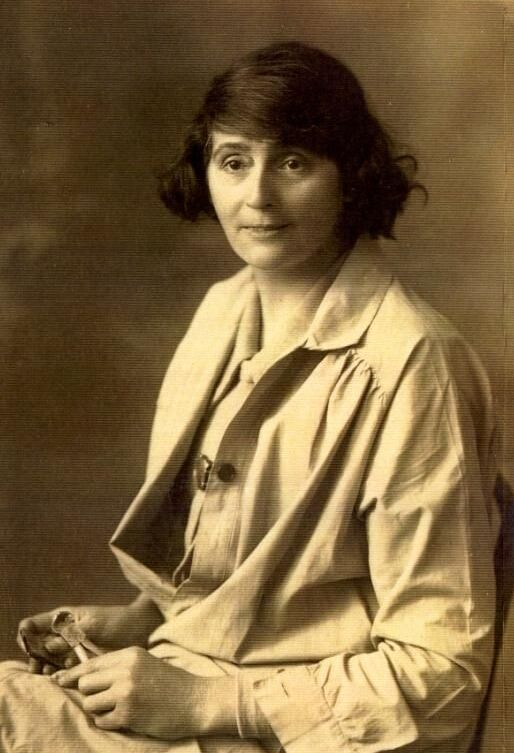
- Born: 1881
- Died: 1952 (aged 70–71)
- Occupation: mosaic artist
- Relatives: Dora and Margaret Martin (Sisters)

Gertrude Martin (21 November 1881 – 21 February 1952) was a British master mosaicist, one of the few women to succeed in this profession. She was apprenticed to George Bridge in 1902, and was recognised as a master mosaicist in 1911. Her mosaics include works at Westminster Cathedral and the Palace of Westminster in London, the Church of St Mary and St Nicholas in Wilton, Wiltshire, and St Anne's Cathedral in Belfast. She designed some of her own mosaics, and also interpreted designs by Robert Anning Bell and Charles Nicholson. She sometimes worked with her sisters, Dora and Margaret Martin.

== Early life and education ==
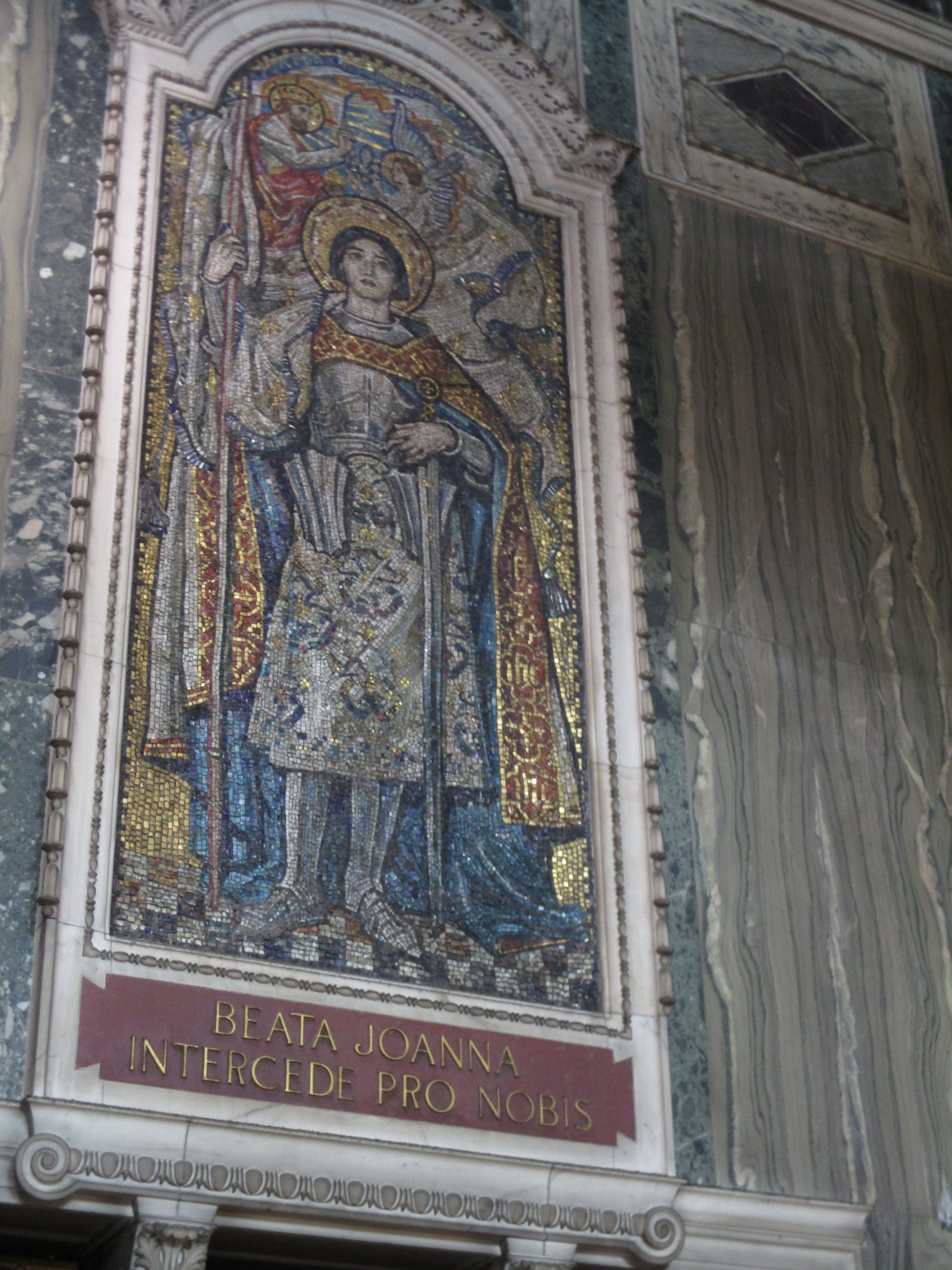
Mosaic of Joan of Arc at Westminster Cathedral, executed by Martin in 1910

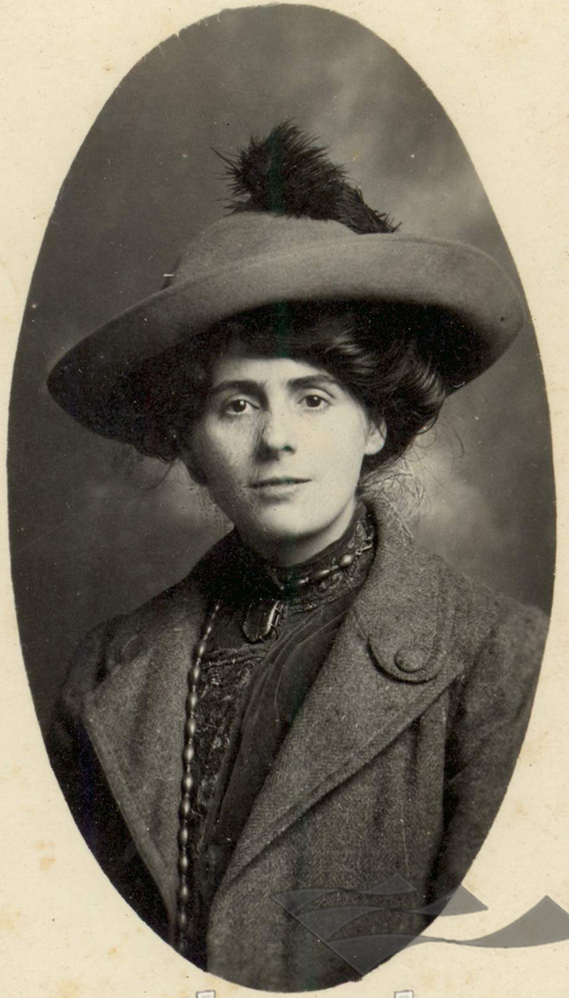
Gertrude Martin in 1910

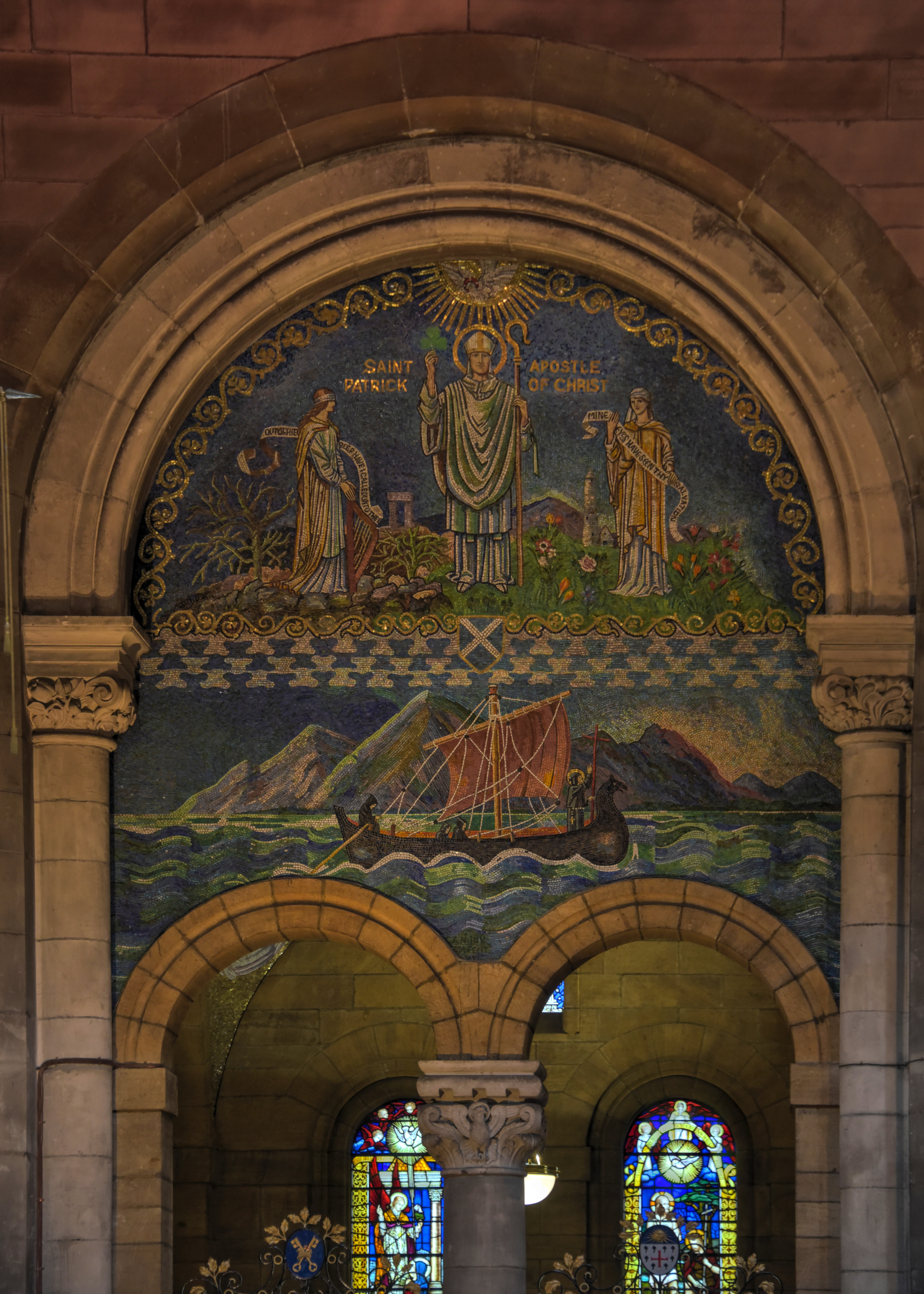
Mosaic of St Patrick at St Anne's Cathedral, executed by Margaret and Gertrude Martin in 1932

Gertrude Martin was born on 21 November 1881 in Thornton Heath, near Croydon, to Harriet Helen (née Stotesbury) and George Thomas Martin, who worked in insurance as an agent. She was one of ten children; two of her sisters, Dora (1893–1957) and Margaret (Madge) also made mosaics. She was baptised at St Peter's Church, Dulwich, on 18 January 1882 and spent her childhood at various addresses in Croydon. She studied art in London and Paris, and later studied mosaics in Ravenna, Milan and Venice.

== Career ==
Gertrude Martin was apprenticed to George Bridge in 1902, along with her sisters Margaret and Dora; Bridge was an artist and worker in mosaics, who had business premises in Mitcham Park, Surrey, and a studio in Oxford Street. In 1902 Bridge and his 26 women mosaicists began an extended period of work in Westminster Cathedral; Martin worked on the chapels of the Holy Souls, and of St Gregory and St Augustine (1902–4), and later on panels in the north transept and inner crypt (1910–11). She also worked under Bridge's direction at the grade-I-listed Church of St Mary and St Nicholas in Wilton, Wiltshire (1908–9), including mosaics in the apse.

From 1911, she started to work as a master craftswoman. Her early commissions were for Westminster Cathedral's lady chapel (1912–13), to designs by Robert Anning Bell. Her earliest design was for St Mary's Catholic Church in Uttoxeter, Staffordshire: The Annunciation (1914). She also completed more mosaics at St Mary and St Nicholas Church, Wilton (1913–20), but her work was interrupted by the First World War, during which she was employed as a clerk. After the war, she created mosaics in Westminster Cathedral's choir (1921–22).

From 1922, she worked with her sister Dora on four arched panels designed by Robert Anning Bell in the Houses of Parliament. Two of these panels are in the Central Lobby and two in St Stephen's Hall. In the Central Lobby, the mosaic of Saint Andrew for Scotland was completed in 1923 and Saint Patrick for Ireland in 1924. In St Stephen's Hall, the mosaic St Stephen, King Stephen and King Edward the Confessor was completed in 1925 and King Edward III commands the rebuilding of St Stephen's Chapel in 1926.

Between 1927 and 1934, she worked with her other sister Margaret at St Anne's Cathedral, Belfast, creating mosaics to the designs of Charles Nicholson in the Baptistry, the Chapel of Holy Spirit, the tympanum above the West Doors and the mural of St Patrick above the entrance to the Chapel of the Holy Spirit. A review in The Times describes the St Anne's Cathedral mosaics as "perhaps the most interesting and beautiful" example of the art in Ireland. She also created mosaics at St John's Church, Angell Town, Brixton (1929), in honour of two of her brothers who had been killed during the First World War. After the Second World War, she did some further work at the lady chapel apse in Wilton (1946–48).

== Personal life ==
Martin did not marry. The family moved to Brixton in around 1903, where Martin spent much of her life, although in 1939, she was living with Dora in the village of Kilmington in Devon. Clementine Churchill, Winston Churchill's wife, organised for her to be awarded a pension from the civil list in her retirement.

Gertrude Martin died from heart failure at her home in St James's Crescent, Brixton on 21 February 1952. Her grave is in Lambeth Cemetery.
