= Santa Maria Maggiore, Tuscania =

Church in Tuscania, Italy

Coordinates: 42°24′51.6″N 11°52′31.4″E

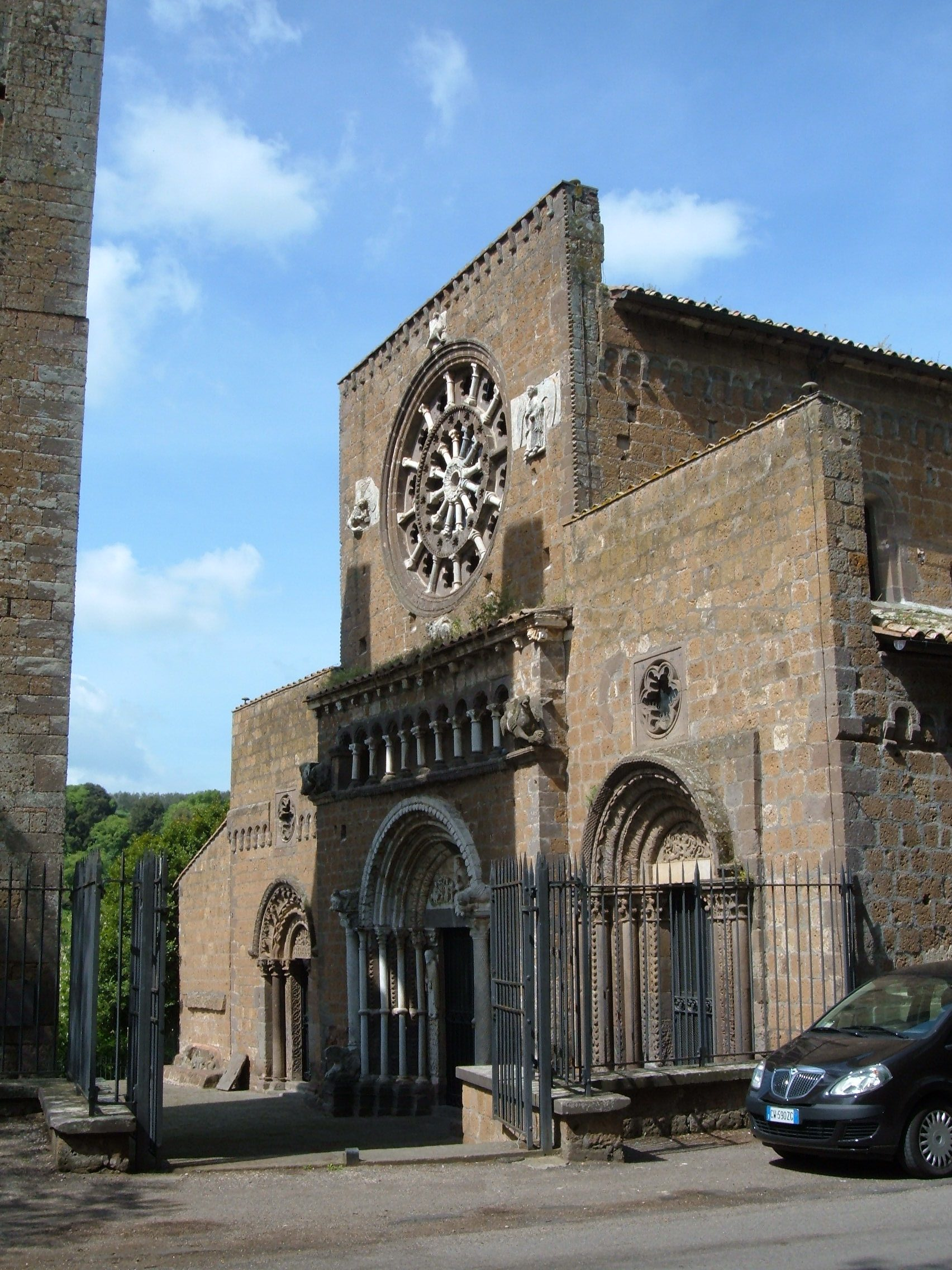
Santa Maria Maggiore, Tuscania

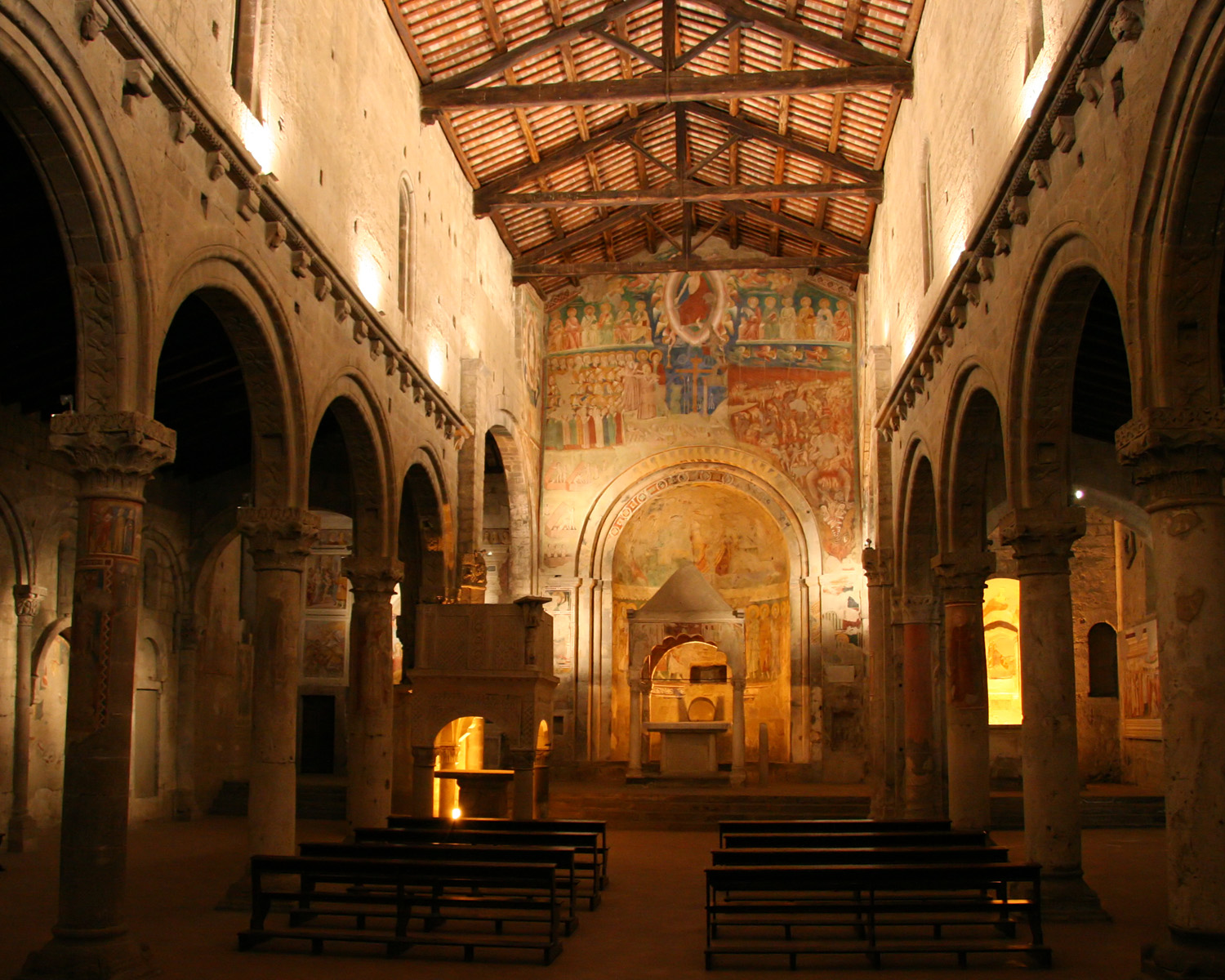
Interior of Santa Maria Maggiore, Tuscania

Santa Maria Maggiore is an ancient Romanesque basilica church located at the foot of Colle di San Pietro (St Peter Hill) in Tuscania, Province of Viterbo, Region of Lazio, Italy. Atop the hill is the Basilica of San Pietro.

== History ==
A church named Santa Maria Maggiore is first documented here in a Papal bull from the year 852 from Pope Leo IV to the Bishop of Tuscania—records of a consecration date to 1206. The church has been reconstructed many times over the centuries.

The facade has three distinctive and finely decorated medieval portals. The central one is flanked by two spiral-fluted marble columns nestled on two "lion" bases, and topped by an animal figure. These enclose four thinner columns receding backwards, each with their individual capital, generally Corinthian in appearance but some contain human figures. In the pilasters flanking the door stand two figures of the Apostles Peter and Paul, partly rebuilt after an act of vandalism. In the lunette are rectangular bas-reliefs, somewhat haphazardly assembled, depicting the Madonna and Child Blessing and images of Balaam, the Sacrifice of Isaac, and the Agnus Dei-like archetype. The right portal is decorated with classically inspired foliage, while the arch on the left features an ornament of the Sicilian-Norman style. At the top is spread between a lion and a griffin, and the loggia above the entrance has nine columns and ten arches.

The semicircular apse is covered by pilasters and bands of arches. The interior has columns and pillars with Romanesque capitals also carved with plant and zoomorphic motifs. Along the walls of the aisles are blind arches that enclose blind arcades of half-pillars. The sanctuary is flanked by two transverse arches; the frontal of the altar, surmounted by a Gothic ciborium. There is a bishop's chair, which consists of a parapet of the eighth and ninth centuries.

In the right aisle is located a 13th-century octagonal baptismal immersion pool. In the nave is a pulpit of the thirteenth century. The apse contains a 13th-century fresco depicting Twelve Apostles; a 14th-century fresco in the chancel arch of the apse depicts San Secondiano and the Last Judgement. This has been attributed to Gregorio and Donato D'Arezzo. One bell tower dates to the 12th century. The church is property of the Ministry for Architectural Structures of the Province of Rome, Rieti and Viterbo.

== See also ==
Church of Santa Maria Maggiore (Cerveteri)
