= San Pietro, Tuscania =

Church building in Lazio, Italy

Coordinates: 42°24′46.0″N 11°52′42.2″E

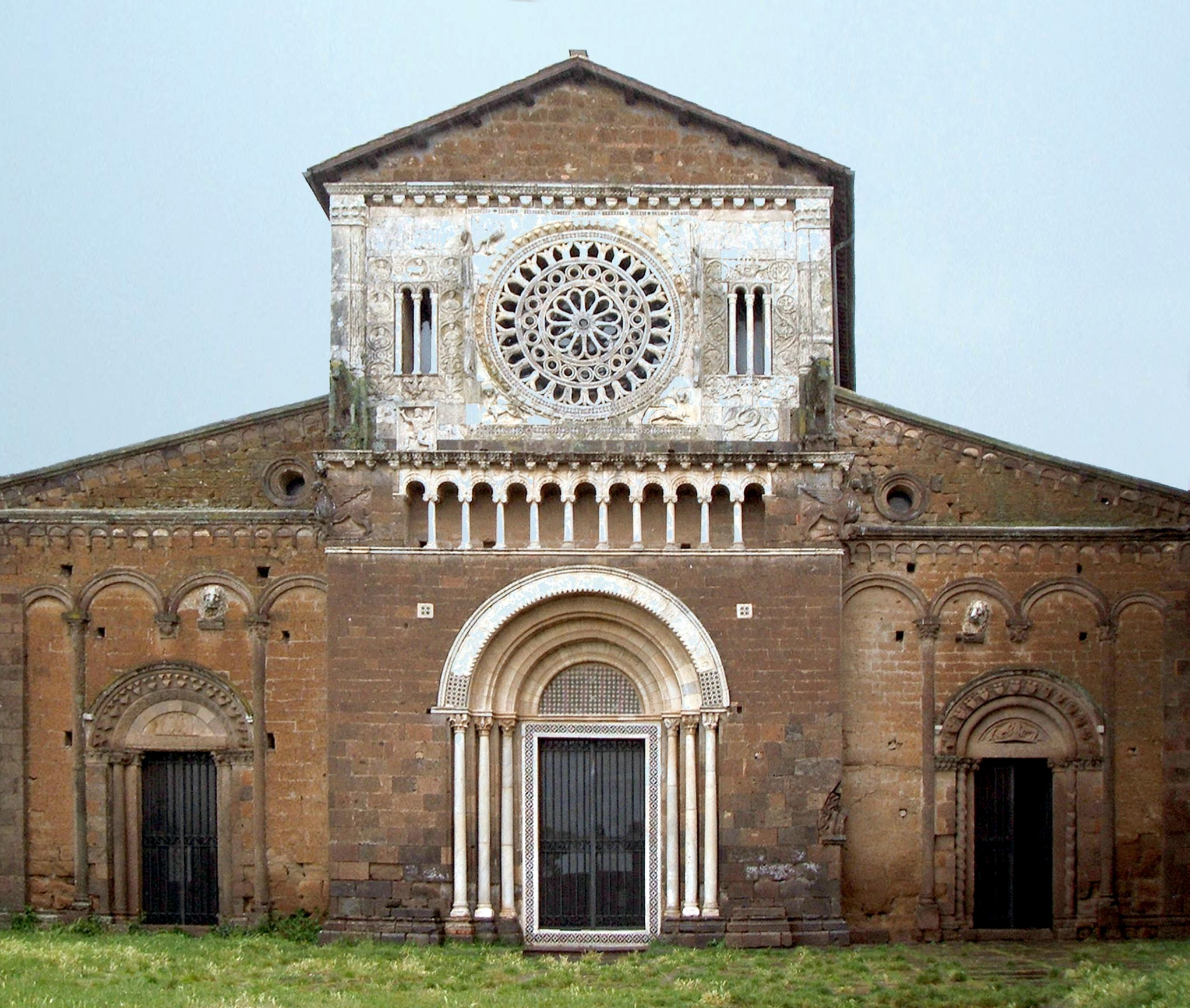
Façade of the church

San Pietro is a Romanesque and Gothic-style, Roman Catholic church just outside Tuscania, in the province of Viterbo, in the region of Lazio, Italy.

The façade has a large rose window, decked with mosaics, hedged at the corners by the symbols of the Four Evangelists, and flanked by reliefs with elaborate carvings of plants, a menagerie of animals, and a complex iconography of saints and figures of the Old Testament.

Below is a loggia and on the ground is a sculpted main portal with a large rounded arch. The nave is flanked by rounded Romanesque arches and leads to a chancel with a ciborium over the main altar. The chancel has a geometric mosaic floor. The crypt has gothic tracery.

== See also ==
- Santa Maria Maggiore, Tuscania
