= Giuseppe Campanari =

Italian baritone and cellist (1855–1927)

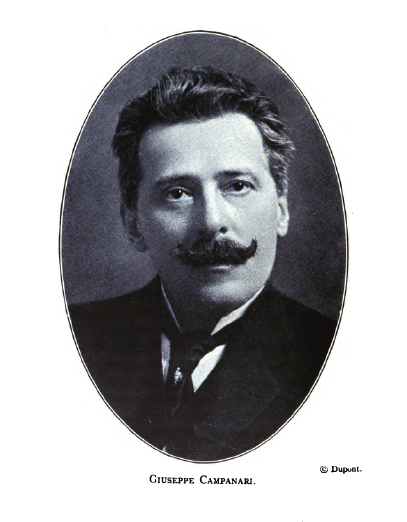
Giuseppe Campanari at the height of his fame.

Giuseppe Campanari (17 November 1855 – 31 May 1927) (Note: Cooke (1921) gives his date of birth as 17 November 1858 but this is unlikely given the d.o.b. of his brother Leandro.) was an Italian-born operatic baritone and cellist. He later became an American citizen.

Campanari performed initially as a cellist at Milan's La Scala and on tour in other parts of Europe, but he later emigrated to the United States, where he played first solo cello for the Boston Symphony Orchestra, and was subsequently appointed professor of cello at the New England Conservatory of Music in Boston. He resigned from both positions to devote himself to singing, which he had studied as a second 'instrument' for years, becoming a major opera star with the Metropolitan Opera.

In addition, he appeared at most of the major opera houses in Europe, including several seasons spent at the Royal Opera in London's Covent Garden, and participated in concert tours with the great sopranos Nordica, Sembrich, Melba and Eames.

== Early career ==
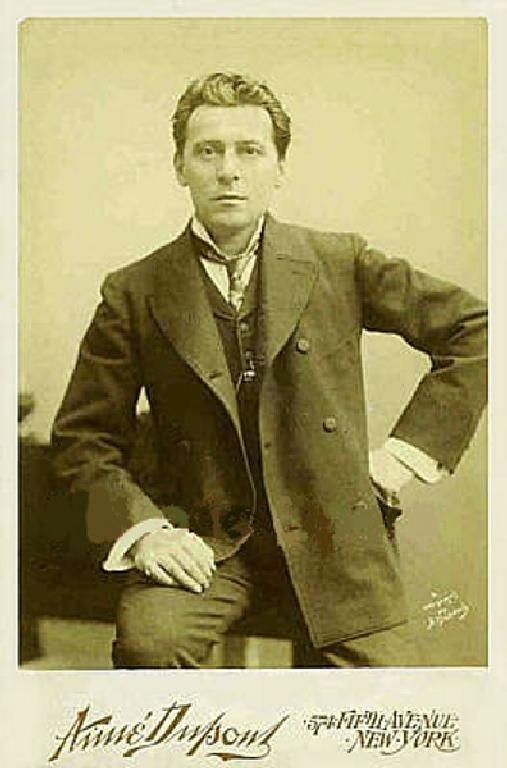
A younger Giuseppe Campanari, photographed in New York by Aimé Dupont

Giuseppe Campanari was born in Venice in 1855 and was hailed as a cello virtuoso by the age of nine. He toured Europe with his brother Leandro, giving concerts in the larger European cities. At the age of seventeen he was appointed first solo cellist at La Scala in Milan under conductor Alberto Mazzucato. During his career as a cellist, he appeared frequently in chamber music concerts with leading artistes such as Joachim, Wieniawski and Saint-Saëns At the same time, vocal art attracted him greatly and he studied voice on the side. His first attempt as an opera singer was in Un ballo in maschera at the Teatro Dal Verme in Milan in 1880. (Note: Grove states that he lost his voice and had to return to the orchestra pit but this is contradicted by the New York Times 7 July 1893.) After singing in the leading Italian cities, he went to Spain.

According to IMDb, his wife was named Mary but this information is questionable. (Note: The IMDb has an erroneous entry stating that Giuseppe was married to Persis Bell. This was the spouse of his brother Leandro Campanari q.v.)

== American career ==
Campanari was invited to the United States by the management of the Boston Symphony Orchestra and arrived in 1884, again taking the position of first solo cellist under conductor Wilhelm Gericke. In 1888 he became one of the original members of the Adamowski String Quartet which was led by violinist Timothee Adamowski.

He first sang Valentine in Faust with the Emma Juch Opera Company when their baritone, Alonzo Stoddard, fell ill, but it was not mentioned in the papers so nothing became of it. He continued to play cello but didn't sing professionally for two years. Finally, after the prominent conductor Arthur Nikisch gave him an opening in Louisville, Kentucky, he started to receive more engagements.

Campanari made his official operatic debut as Tonio in I Pagliacci with Hinrichs' Opera Company in New York City on 15 June 1893, being the first singer to perform the role in the United States.

His New York Metropolitan Opera debut came on 30 November 1894, when he sang the role of the Count di Luna in Il trovatore (Note: He had previously sung this role with Hinrichs and the New York Times (16 May 1893) described that performance as "the most satisfactory work of the evening".) with the great heroic tenor Tamagno as Manrico. In 1895, he had his first notable success singing Ford in the first American production of Falstaff, with Victor Maurel in the title role. He also sang the Met's first Marcello in La Bohème (1900) and their first Papageno in Die Zauberflöte (1902–1903) which was performed in Italian.

Campanari remained with the Met until 1912. He gave more than 200 performances during his career there.

After his retirement from serious music, he briefly dabbled in vaudeville but found the two-show-a-day schedule too gruelling at his age. He then taught voice in New York and later in Milan where his daughter Marina achieved success as a soprano. He died in Milan in 1927 at the age of 71.

Campanari made a number of acoustic recordings prior to World War I. His first recording session was with the Columbia label in 1903. Despite the early date of his discs, they are remarkable for their clarity, and they display the warmth and agility of his fine, steady, well-trained voice to good effect. Some of his recordings are available on CD reissues.
