= Tuscanian dice =

Etruscan archaeological artifact

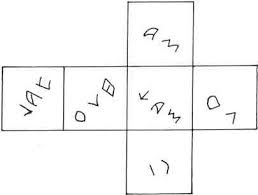
The inscriptions on one of the dice. From top, left to right: śa, zal, huθ, maχ, θu, ci

The Tuscanian dice or dice of Toscanella are a pair of dice, found in 1848 in the town of Tuscania, on which are inscribed the numerals 'one' to 'six' in Etruscan. It is one of the primary pieces of evidence for the numerals of the Etruscan language.

The sides are inscribed,

θu, zal, ci, huθ, maχ, śa,

which are thought to have been pronounced

[tʰu], [tsal], [ki], [hutʰ], [makʰ] (or maybe [makʷʰ]) and [ʃa].

Opposite faces of both dice display θu and huθ, zal and maχ, and ci and śa.

It is universally agreed, based on other inscriptions, that θu, zal, ci and maχ are 'one', 'two', 'three' and 'five'. Huθ and śa must therefore be 'four' and 'six', but it is debated which is which.

Etruscan dice marked with pips show two arrangements, an older (1:2, 3:4, 5:6), with each pair differing by one, and a younger (1:6, 2:5, 3:4), with each pair adding to seven (the now universal pattern). In both arrangements, the numbers 3 and 4 are opposite each other, so śa, which is opposite ci 'three', must be the Etruscan word for 'four'.

However, this conclusion contradicts a long line of evidence that śa is 'six' and huθ is 'four'.
