= Tuscania =

- Comune
- Comune di Tuscania
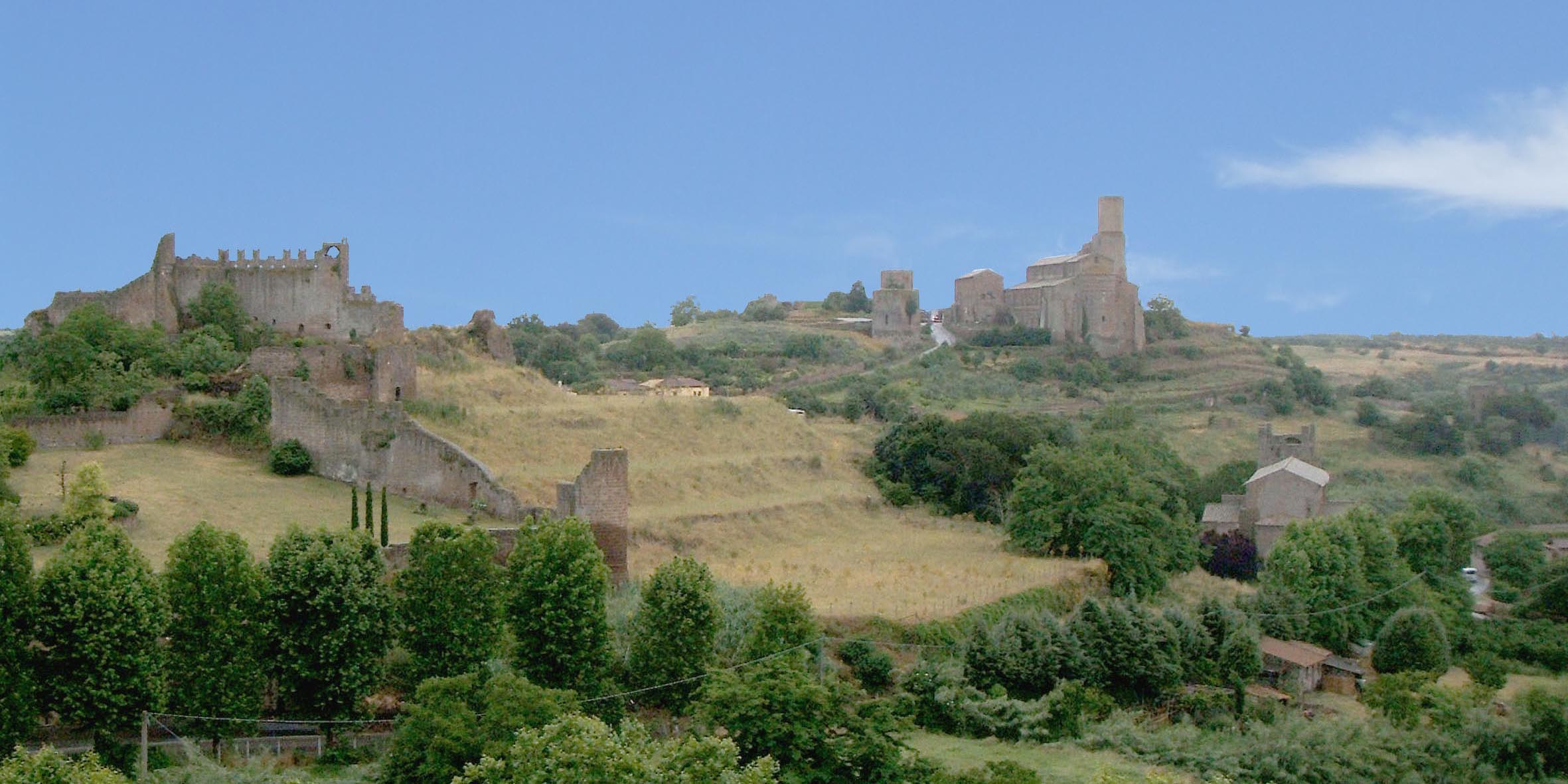

- Flag Coat of arms

- Location within Italy Location within Lazio
- Coordinates: 42°25′06″N 11°52′15″E
- Country: Italy
- Region: Lazio
- Province: Viterbo (VT)

Government
  - Mayor: Fabio Bartolacci

Area
  - Total: 208.03 km^{2} (80.32 sq mi)
- Elevation: 165 m (541 ft)

Population (31 December 2015)
  - Total: 8,451
  - Density: 40.62/km^{2} (105.2/sq mi)
- Demonym(s): Tuscaniesi, Tuscanesi or Toscanellesi
- Time zone: UTC+1 (CET)
  - Summer (DST): UTC+2 (CEST)
- Postal code: 01017
- Dialing code: 0761
- ISTAT code: 056052
- Patron saint: Sts. Secondianus, Verianus and Marcellianus Martyrs
- Saint day: August 8
- Website: Official website

Tuscania is a town and comune in the province of Viterbo, Lazio Region, Italy. Until the late 19th century the town was known as Toscanella.

== History ==
=== Antiquity ===
According to the legend, Tuscania was founded by Aeneas' son, Ascanius, where he had found twelve dog pups (whence the Etruscan name Tus-Cana, cana being similar to Latin canis for "dog"). Another legend attributes the foundation to one Tusco, son of Hercules and Araxes.

Evidence of human presence in the area dates from the Neolithic age, but probably the city proper was founded in the 7th century BC when the acropolis on St. Peter's Hill was surrounded by a line of walls. Villages existed in the vicinity. In the following years its strategic position gave Tuscania a leading role in the Etruscan world. After the defeat of the coastal cities by the Greeks (4th century BC), Tuscania also became a maritime trade centre through the port of Regas (next to today's Montalto di Castro). There is no record of Tuscania being involved in the battles that led to the Roman conquest of the Etruscan northern Lazio (280 BC), as the city probably entered into the Roman orbit peacefully. The agricultural development and construction of the Via Clodia further boosted the economic situation of the city. It became a municipium in 88 BC.

=== Middle Ages and Renaissance ===
In the 5th century AD (or earlier, depending on the source), Tuscania became one of the first bishopric sees in Italy.

After the fall of the Western Roman Empire, it fell to the Lombards in 569 or 574. In 781 it became part of the Papal States. In 967–1066 it was a fief of the Anguillara family and then of the marquises of Tuscany. In 1081 it was besieged by Emperor Henry IV.

In the following century it became a free commune with authority over a wide territory, including numerous castles. The inner struggles within Tuscania led to a loss of prestige, in favour of the nearby Viterbo, which was made a diocese in 1192, formally on split-off territory, but virtually achieved a transfer by immediate, constant personal union under Viterbo's bishops until the 1896 former merger of the Tuscania bishopric (as it had been renamed in 1911) into the Viterbo diocese. In 1222 St. Francis of Assisi sojourned in the city.

During the struggle between the Guelphs and Ghibellines throughout the Holy Roman Empire, it was captured by Frederick II of Hohenstaufen on March 2, 1240, and provided with a line of walls.

A failed military expedition against Pope Boniface VIII (early 14th century), led to the submission to Rome, with the pejorative name of Tuscanella. In 1348–49 a bubonic plague struck Tuscania very hard. Shortly thereafter, in 1354, Cardinal Gil Alvarez De Albornoz definitively returned the town to the Papal States.

In 1421 it became a county under the condottiero Angelo Broglio da Lavello.

In 1495 it was ravaged by the French troops of King Charles VIII during his march towards the Kingdom of Naples, much thanks to the destruction of the walls ordered by Cardinal Giovanni Vitelleschi in reply to the continual internecine struggles and public riots. Thereafter the city experienced a long decline which lasted until the annexation to the new unified Kingdom of Italy in 1870.

=== Modern times ===
In the 19th century the local Campanari family spearheaded the exploration of Etruscan tombs. They organized the first Etruscan exhibition in London. Many of the valuable discoveries ended up in various European museums, as well as Tuscania's own Archeological Museum.

On February 6, 1971 an earthquake caused 31 deaths. The town has been meticulously restored since, and the historic quarter is substantial, completely surrounded by the medieval city walls that offer excellent views over the surrounding countryside and the church of St Peter.

== Main sights ==
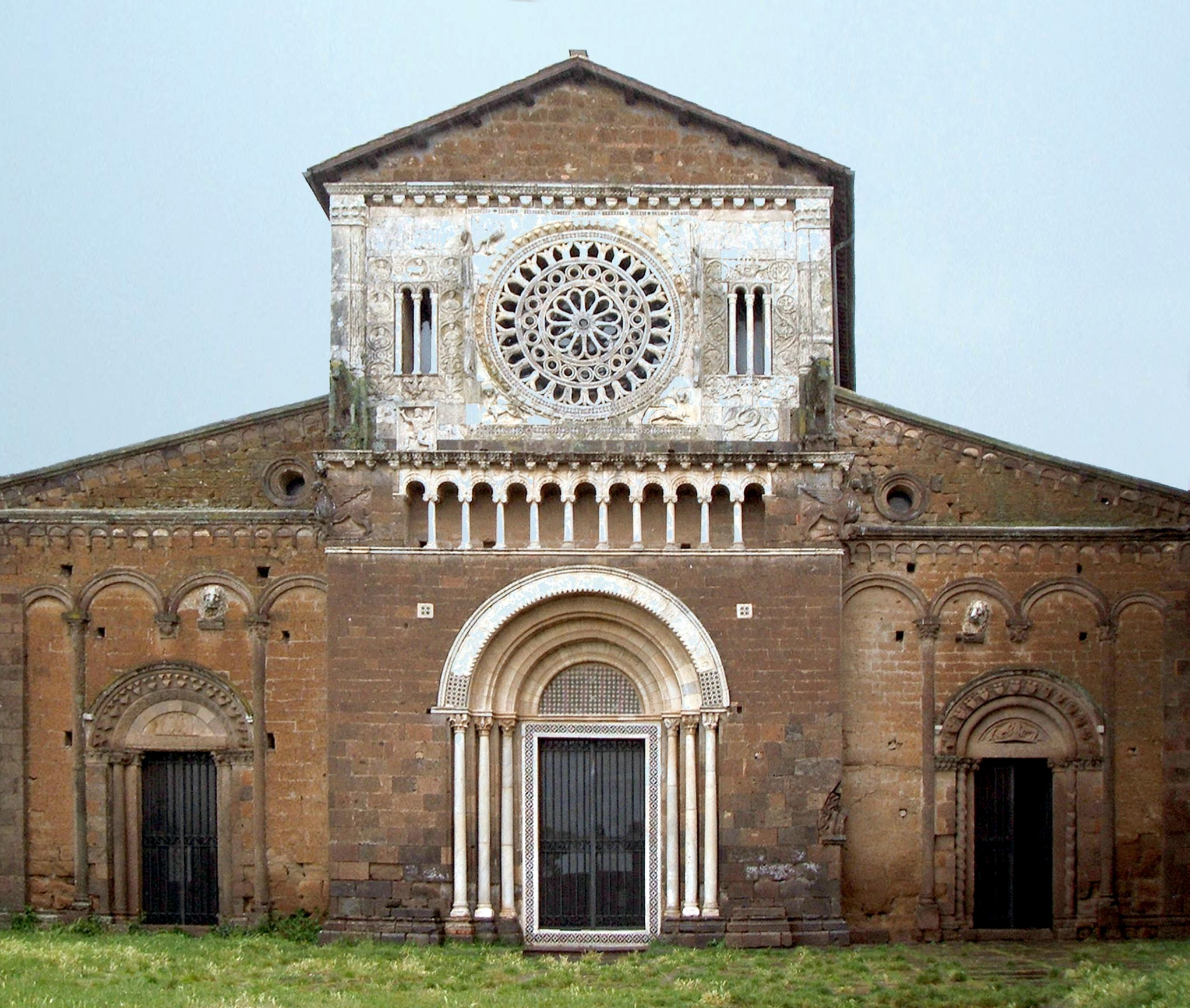
Façade of the Church of San Pietro

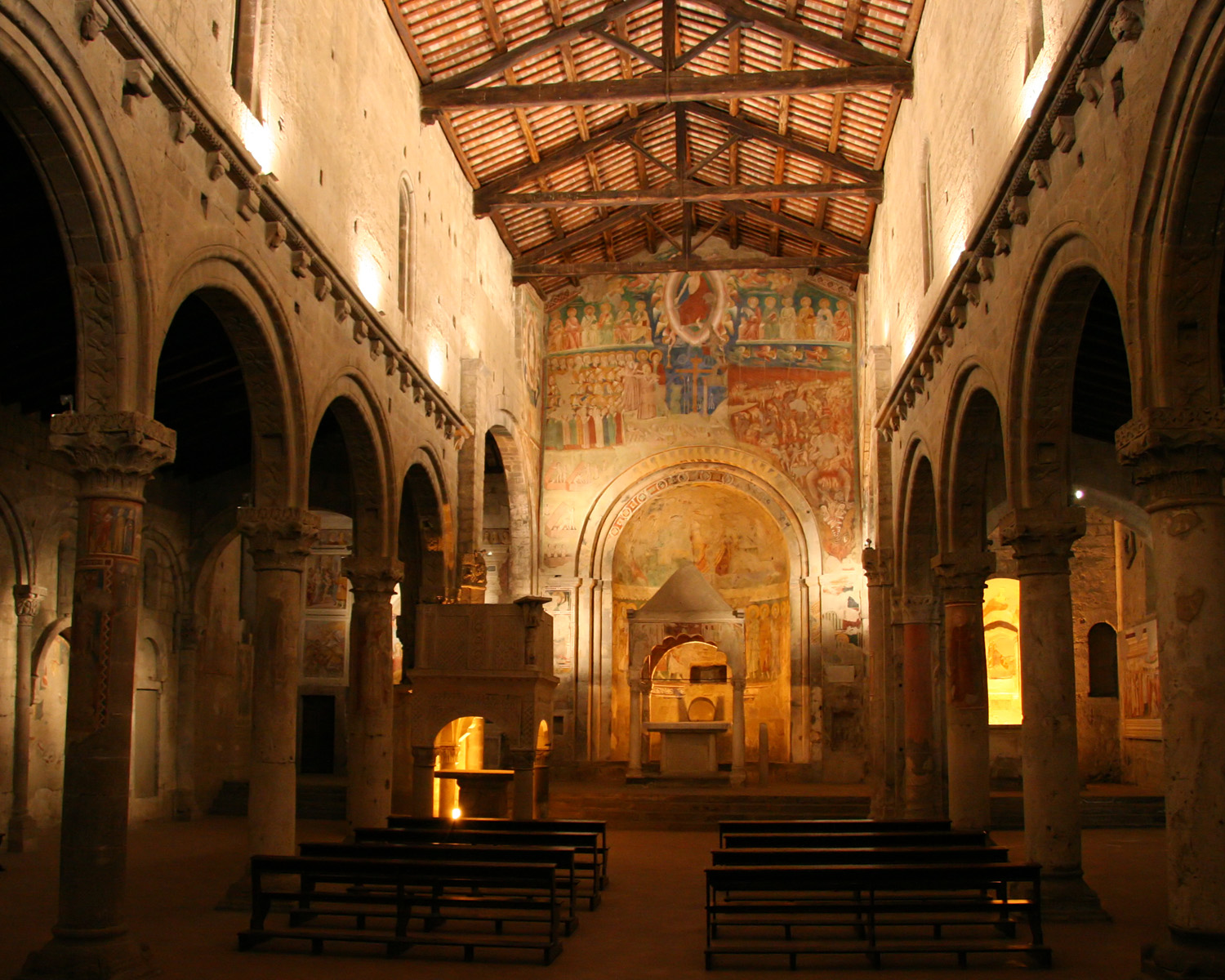
Interior of Santa Maria Maggiore

The main attraction of the city is the Church of San Pietro, built in Lombard-Romanesque style, begun in the year 739 and renovated in the 11th–12th centuries. The interior has a nave and two aisles divided by low columns and pilasters incorporating half-columns, with antique and mediaeval capitals. The façade with its rose window also dates from the 12th century.

Other sights include:

- Etruscan Museum, housed in the former Franciscan convent of Santa Maria del Riposo, with sarcophagi from nearby tombs, as well as other objects from the tombs.
- Church of Santa Maria Maggiore. The Romanesque Basilica has a façade with three finely decorated portals. The interior is on a nave and two aisles, divided by columns with sculpted capitals. The recessed entrance is flanked by a pair of free standing columns intended to evoke the Boaz and Jachin of the Temple of Solomon at Jerusalem.
- The Tower of Lavello
- Fontana delle Sette Cannelle a medieval fountain made with Roman materials
- Etruscan necropolises, including the Tomb of the Queen and Pian di Mola.
- Remains of the ancient Via Clodia, which connected the town with Rome.

== See also ==
- Roman Catholic Diocese of Tuscanella
- Tuscanian dice
