= Tonal system (Nystrom) =

Proposed base 16 system

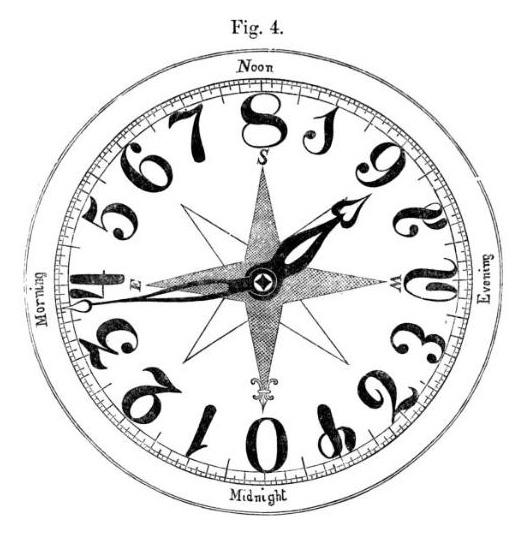
Proposed clock-face with noon on top The proposed figures on the right are based on rotations of those on the left (assigning value 10 to symbol 9).

The tonal system is a base 16 system of notation (predating the widespread use of hexadecimal in computing), arithmetic, and metrology proposed in 1859 by John W. Nystrom. In addition to new weights and measures, his proposal included a new calendar with sixteen months, a new system of coinage, and a clock with sixteen major divisions of the day (called tims). Nystrom advocated his system thus:

I am not afraid, or do not hesitate, to advocate a binary system of arithmetic and metrology. I know I have nature on my side; if I do not succeed to impress upon you its utility and great importance to mankind, it will reflect that much less credit upon our generation, upon scientific men and philosophers.

== Names for the numbers ==
He proposed names for the digits, calling zero "noll" and counting (from one to sixteen):

"An, de, ti, go, su, by, ra, me, ni, ko, hu, vy, la, po, fy, ton." (Therefore, tonal system.)

Because hexadecimal requires sixteen digits, Nystrom supplemented the existing decimal digits 0 through 9 with his own invented characters (shown on his clockface above) and changed the value of 9 to ten. (Unicode approximation: ⬯𐑑߶ƷႷ5678𝓈9꒹🝣𐐁ꯖⳠ) Later, the hexadecimal notation overcame this same obstacle by using the digits 0 through 9 followed by the letters A through F.

The numbers 11_{16} and 12_{16} would be said "tonan", "tonde", etc. The table below shows Nystrom's names for successive powers of 10_{16}.

Base 16 Number	Tonal Name	Decimal Equivalent
10	ton	16
100	san	256
1000	mill	4,096
1,0000	bong	65,536
10,0000	tonbong	1,048,576
100,0000	sanbong	16,777,216
1000,0000	millbong	268,435,456
1,0000,0000	tam	4,294,967,296
1,0000,0000,0000	song	16^12
1,0000,0000,0000,0000	tran	16^16
1,0000,0000,0000,0000,0000	bongtran	16^20

Thus, the hexadecimal number 1510,0000 would be "mill-susanton-bong". This first hexadecimal system, proposed in the 19th century, has thus far not achieved widespread usage.

Although Nystrom did not propose a language for tonal fractions, his nomenclature for units of measure does provide one: the name of a power of sixteen before the base unit's name multiplies it by that number, but a power of sixteen after the base unit's name divides it by that number. Thus, de timtons means 1/8 tim.

== Geography ==
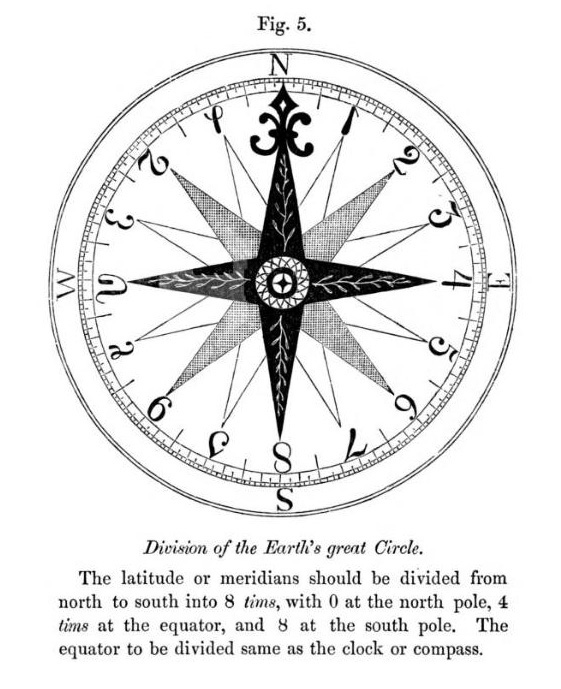
Nystrom's hexadecimal compass

For latitudes he put 0 at the North Pole, 4 at the equator and 8 at the South Pole. The units were called tims. They are the same as the colatitudes measured in turns times 16.

Tonal (in tims)	ISO 6709	Colatitude (in degrees)	Colatitude (in turns)
0	090	0°	0
1	67.5		
2	045	45°	0.125
3	022.5		
4	000	90°	0.25
5	−22.5		
6	−045	135°	0.375
7	−67.5		
8	−090	180°	0.5

== Music ==
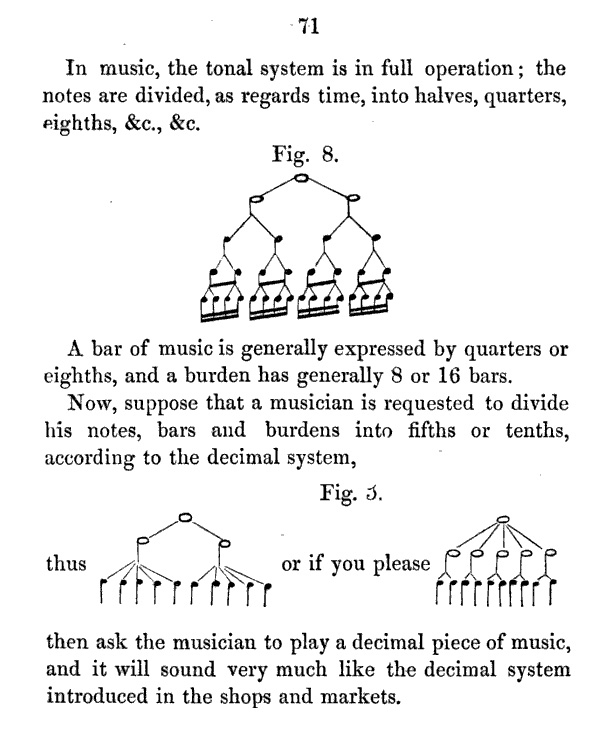
A page in the tonal system book

In his book he made a reference to music notation, where binary division is already in use for time. He also discussed the problem of pitch inflation, which he proposed to solve by setting the A below middle C to a frequency of san per timmill (194 Hz).

== See also ==
- Earthly branches
