= Perm =

Perm or PERM may refer to:

== Places ==
- Perm, Russia, a city in Russia
  - Permsky District, the district
  - Perm Krai, a federal subject of Russia since 2005
  - Perm Oblast, a former federal subject of Russia 1938–2005
  - Perm Governorate, an administrative unit until 1923
  - Great Perm, a medieval state
- Perm, Ontario, a small community in Canada

== Other uses ==
- Perm (hairstyle), or permanent hairstyle, that may last for several months
- Perm (unit), a unit of permeance (or water vapor transmission) of materials and membranes
- PERM (computer), an early electronic computer
- Permanent Labor Certification (Program Electronic Review Management), an American electronic labor certification system
- Progressive encephalomyelitis with rigidity and myoclonus, a subtype of stiff-person syndrome, a neurological disorder
- P.E.R.M. or Petrol Electric railmotor
- "Perm", a 2016 song by Bruno Mars from 24K Magic
- Permian, a geologic period

== See also ==
- Permian (disambiguation)
- Permsky (disambiguation)
- Permutation (mathematics)
- UEC-Perm Engines, a Russian company
