= Hexadecimal =

Base-16 numeric representation

Hexadecimal (or hex for short) is a positional numeral system for representing a numeric value as base 16. For the most common convention, a digit is represented as "0" to "9" in the same way as decimal and as a letter of the alphabet from "A" to "F" (either upper or lower case) for the digits with decimal value 10 to 15.

As typical computer hardware is binary in nature and 16 is a power of 2, the hex representation is often used in computing as a dense representation of binary information. A hex digit represents 4 contiguous bits–known as a nibble. An 8-bit byte is two hex digits, such as 2C.

Special notation is often used to indicate that a number is hex. In mathematics, a subscript is typically used to specify the base. For example, the decimal value 491 would be expressed in hex as 1EB_{16}. In computer programming, various notations are used. In C and many related languages, the prefix 0x is used. For example, 0x1EB.

== Written representation ==
=== Common convention ===
Typically, a hex representation convention allows either lower or upper case letters and treats the letter the same regardless of its case.

Often when rendering non-textual data, a value stored in memory is displayed as a sequence of hex digits with spaces between values. For instance, in the following hex dump, each 8-bit byte is a 2-digit hex number, with spaces between them, while the 32-bit offset at the start is an 8-digit hex number.

00000000  57 69 6B 69 70 65 64 69  61 2C 20 74 68 65 20 66
00000010  72 65 65 20 65 6E 63 79  63 6C 6F 70 65 64 69 61
00000020  20 74 68 61 74 20 61 6E  79 6F 6E 65 20 63 61 6E
00000030  20 65 64 69 74 2C 20 69  6E 63 6C 75 64 69 6E 67
00000040  20 79 6F 75 20 28 61 6E  64 20 6D 65 29 21

=== Identification ===
There are several conventions for expressing that a number is represented as hex.

- A decimal subscript can give the base explicitly. For example 159_{10} indicates decimal 159, 159_{16} indicates hex 159. Some prefer a text subscript, such as 159_{decimal} and 159_{hex}, or 159_{d} and 159_{h}
- In C and many languages influenced by it, the prefix 0x indicates that the numeric literal after it is in hex, a character of a string or character literal can be expressed as hex with the prefix \x (for example '\x1B' represents the Esc control character) and to output an integer as hex via printf-like function, the format conversion code %X or %x is used
- In URIs (including URLs), character codes are written as hex pairs prefixed with %: http://www.example.com/name%20with%20spaces where %20 is the code for the space (blank) character, ASCII code point 20 in hex, 32 in decimal.
- In XML and XHTML, a character can be expressed as a hex numeric character reference using the notation &#xcode;, for instance &#x0054; represents the character U+0054 (the uppercase letter "T"). If there is no x the number is decimal (thus &#0084; is the same character).
- In Intel-derived assembly languages and Modula-2, hex is denoted with a suffixed H or h: FFh or 05A3H. Some implementations require a leading zero when the first hex digit character is not a decimal digit, so one would write 0FFh instead of FFh. Some other implementations (such as NASM) allow C-style numbers (0x42)
- Other assembly languages (6502, Motorola), Pascal, Delphi, some versions of BASIC (Commodore), GameMaker Language, Godot and Forth use $ as a prefix: $5A3, $C1F27ED
- Some assembly languages (Microchip) use the notation H'ABCD' (for ABCD_{16}); similarly, Fortran 95 uses Z'ABCD'
- Ada and VHDL enclose hex numerals in based "numeric quotes": 16#5A3#, 16#C1F27ED#. For bit vector constants VHDL uses the notation x"5A3", x"C1F27ED".
- Verilog represents hex constants in the form 8'hFF, where 8 is the number of bits in the value and FF is the hex constant
- The Icon and Smalltalk languages use the prefix 16r: 16r5A3
- PostScript and the Bourne shell and its derivatives denote hex with prefix 16#: 16#5A3, 16#C1F27ED
- Common Lisp uses the prefixes #x and #16r. Setting the variables *read-base* and *print-base* to 16 can also be used to switch the reader and printer of a Common Lisp system to hex representation for reading and printing numbers. Thus hex numbers can be represented without the #x or #16r prefix code, when the input or output base has been changed to 16.
- MSX BASIC, QuickBASIC, FreeBASIC and Visual Basic prefix hex numbers with &H: &H5A3
- BBC BASIC and Locomotive BASIC use & for hex
- TI-89 and 92 series uses a 0h prefix: 0h5A3, 0hC1F27ED
- ALGOL 68 uses the prefix 16r to denote hex numbers: 16r5a3, 16rC1F27ED. Binary, quaternary (base-4), and octal numbers can be specified similarly.
- The most common format for hex on IBM mainframes (zSeries) and midrange computers (IBM i) running the traditional OS's (zOS, zVSE, zVM, TPF, IBM i) is X'5A3' or X'C1F27ED', and is used in Assembler, PL/I, COBOL, JCL, scripts, commands and other places. This format was common on other (and now obsolete) IBM systems as well. Occasionally quotation marks were used instead of apostrophes.
- Donald Knuth used a typewriter typeface to represent hex in his book The TeXbook, like: 5A3, C1F27ED

=== Implicit ===
In some contexts, a number is always written as hex, and therefore, needs no identification notation.

- In the Unicode standard, a character value is represented with U+ followed by the hex value, e.g. U+00A1 is the inverted exclamation point (¡).
- Color references in HTML, CSS and X Window can be expressed with six hex digits (two each for the red, green and blue components, in that order) prefixed with #: magenta, for example, is represented as #FF00FF. CSS also allows 3-hexdigit abbreviations with one hexdigit per component: #FA3 abbreviates #FFAA33, a golden orange.
- In MIME (e-mail extensions) quoted-printable encoding, character codes are written as hex pairs prefixed with =: Espa=F1a is "España" (F1_{hex} is the code for ñ in the ISO/IEC 8859-1 character set).
- PostScript binary data (such as image pixels) can be expressed as unprefixed consecutive hex pairs: AA213FD51B3801043FBC ...
- Any IPv6 address can be written as eight groups of four hex digits (sometimes called hextets), where each group is separated by a colon (:). This, for example, is a valid IPv6 address: 2001:0db8:85a3:0000:0000:8a2e:0370:7334 or abbreviated by removing leading zeros as 2001:db8:85a3::8a2e:370:7334 (IPv4 addresses are usually written in decimal).
- Globally unique identifiers are written as thirty-two hex digits, often in unequal hyphen-separated groupings, for example 3F2504E0-4F89-41D3-9A0C-0305E82C3301.

=== Alternative symbols ===
Bruce Alan Martin's hex notation proposal

Ronald O. Whitaker's hex notation proposal.

Notable other hexadecimal representations that use symbols other than letters "A" through "F" to represent the digits above 9 include:

- During the 1950s, some installations, such as Bendix-14, favored using the digits 0 through 5 with an overline to denote the values 10–15 as 0̅, 1̅, 2̅, 3̅, 4̅ and 5̅.
- The SWAC (1950) and Bendix G-15 (1956) computers used the lowercase letters u, v, w, x, y and z for the values 10 to 15.
- The ORDVAC and ILLIAC I (1952) computers (and some derived designs, e.g. BRLESC) used the uppercase letters K, S, N, J, F and L for the values 10 to 15.
- The Librascope LGP-30 (1956) used the letters F, G, J, K, Q and W for the values 10 to 15.
- On the PERM (1956) computer, hex numbers were written as letters O for zero, A to N and P for 1 to 15. Many machine instructions had mnemonic hex-codes (A=add, M=multiply, L=load, F=fixed-point etc.); programs were written without instruction names.
- The Honeywell Datamatic D-1000 (1957) used the lowercase letters b, c, d, e, f, and g whereas the Elbit 100 (1967) used the uppercase letters B, C, D, E, F and G for the values 10 to 15.
- The Monrobot XI (1960) used the letters S, T, U, V, W and X for the values 10 to 15.
- The NEC parametron computer NEAC 1103 (1960) used the letters D, G, H, J, K (and possibly V) for values 10–15.
- The Pacific Data Systems 1020 (1964) used the letters L, C, A, S, M and D for the values 10 to 15.
- New numeric symbols and names were introduced in the Bibi-binary notation by Boby Lapointe in 1968.
- Bruce Alan Martin of Brookhaven National Laboratory considered the choice of A–F "ridiculous". In a 1968 letter to the editor of the CACM, he proposed an entirely new set of symbols based on the bit locations.
- In 1972, Ronald O. Whitaker of Rowco Engineering Co. proposed a triangular font that allows "direct binary reading" to "permit both input and output from computers without respect to encoding matrices".
- Some seven-segment display decoder chips (i.e., 74LS47) show unexpected output due to logic designed only to produce 0–9 correctly.
Bibi-binary

=== Sign ===
The hex system can express negative numbers the same way as in decimal, by putting a minus sign (−) before the number to indicate that it is negative.

=== Bit pattern ===
Hex can express the bit pattern in a processor, so a sequence of hex digits may represent a signed or even a floating-point value. This way, the negative number −42_{10} can be written as FFFF FFD6 in a 32-bit CPU register (in two's complement), as C228 0000 in a 32-bit FPU register or C045 0000 0000 0000 in a 64-bit FPU register (in the IEEE floating-point standard).

=== Exponential notation ===
Just as decimal numbers can be represented in exponential notation, so too can hex numbers. P notation uses the letter P (or p, for "power"), whereas E (or e) serves a similar purpose in decimal E notation. The number after the P is decimal and represents the binary exponent. Increasing the exponent by 1 multiplies by 2, not 16: 20p0 = 10p1 = 8p2 = 4p3 = 2p4 = 1p5. Usually, the number is normalized so that the hex digits start with 1. (zero is usually 0 with no P).

Example: 1.3DEp42 represents 1.3DE_{16} × 2^{42_{10}}.

P notation is required by the IEEE 754-2008 binary floating-point standard and can be used for floating-point literals in the C99 edition of the C programming language. Using the %a or %A conversion specifiers, this notation can be produced by implementations of the printf family of functions following the C99 specification and Single Unix Specification (IEEE Std 1003.1) POSIX standard.

== Verbal representation ==
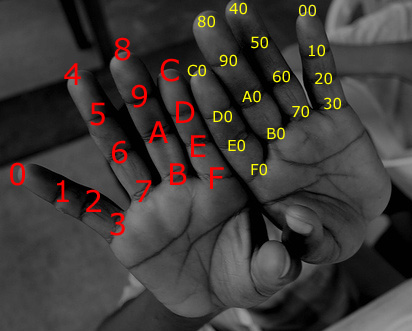
Hex finger-counting scheme

Most European languages lack non-decimal-based words for some of the numerals eleven to fifteen. Some people read hex numbers digit by digit, like a phone number, or using the NATO phonetic alphabet, the Joint Army/Navy Phonetic Alphabet, or a similar ad hoc system. In the wake of the adoption of hex among IBM System/360 programmers, Magnuson (1968) suggested a pronunciation guide that gave short names to the letters of hex – for instance, "A" was pronounced "ann", B "bet", C "chris", etc. Another naming-system was published online by Rogers (2007) that tries to make the verbal representation distinguishable in any case, even when the actual number does not contain numbers A–F. Examples are listed in the tables below. Yet another naming system was elaborated by Babb (2015), based on a joke in Silicon Valley.

Others have proposed using the verbal Morse code conventions to express four-bit hex digits, with "dit" and "dah" representing zero and one, respectively, so that "0000" is voiced as "dit-dit-dit-dit" (....), "dah-dit-dit-dah" (-..-) voices the digit with a value of nine, and "dah-dah-dah-dah" (----) voices the hex digit for decimal 15.

Systems of counting on digits have been devised for both binary and hex. Arthur C. Clarke suggested using each finger as an on/off bit, allowing finger counting from zero to 1023_{10} on ten fingers. Another system for counting up to FF_{16} (255_{10}) is illustrated on the right.

Magnuson (1968) naming method
Hex	Name	Decimal
A	ann	10
B	bet	11
C	chris	12
D	dot	13
E	ernest	14
F	frost	15
1A	annteen	26
A0	annty	160
5B	fifty bet	91
A01C	annty christeen	40,988
1AD0	annteen dotty	6,864
3A7D	thirty ann seventy dot	14,973

Rogers (2007) naming method
Hex	Name	Decimal
A	ten	10
B	eleven	11
C	twelve	12
D	draze	13
E	eptwin	14
F	fim	15
10	tex	16
11	oneteek	17
1F	fimteek	31
50	fiftek	80
C0	twelftek	192
100	hundrek	256
1000	thousek	4,096
3E	thirtek eptwin	62
E1	eptek one	225
C4A	twelve hundrek fourtek ten	3,146
1743	one thousek seven hundrek fourtek three	5,955

== Conversion ==
=== Binary conversion ===
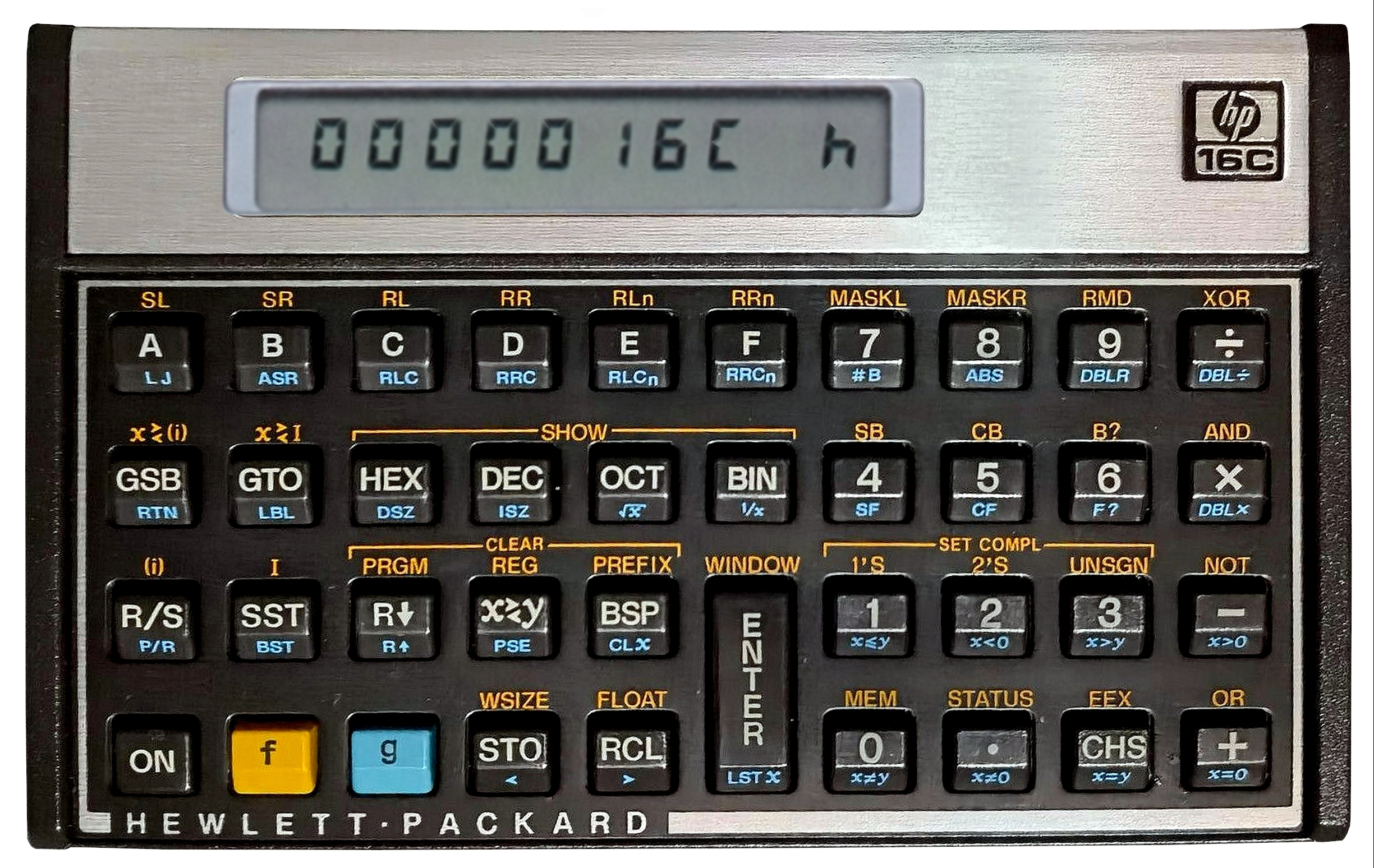
The programmable RPN-calculator HP-16C Computer Scientist from 1982 was designed for programmers. One of its key features was the conversion between different numeral systems (note hex number in display).

Most computers manipulate binary data, but it is difficult for humans to work with a large number of digits for even a relatively small binary number. Although most humans are familiar with the base 10 system, it is much easier to map binary to hex than to decimal because each hex digit maps to a whole number of bits (4_{10}). This example converts 1111_{2} to base ten. Since each position in a binary numeral can contain either a 1 or a 0, its value may be easily determined by its position from the right:

- 0001_{2} = 1_{10}
- 0010_{2} = 2_{10}
- 0100_{2} = 4_{10}
- 1000_{2} = 8_{10}

Therefore:

1111_{2}	= 8_{10} + 4_{10} + 2_{10} + 1_{10}
	= 15_{10}

With little practice, mapping 1111_{2} to F_{16} in one step becomes easy. The advantage of using hex rather than decimal increases rapidly with the size of the number. When the number becomes large, conversion to decimal is very tedious. However, when mapping to hex, it is trivial to regard the binary string as 4-digit groups and map each to a single hex digit.

This example shows the conversion of a binary number to decimal, mapping each digit to the decimal value, and adding the results.

(1001011100)_{2}	= 512_{10} + 64_{10} + 16_{10} + 8_{10} + 4_{10}
	= 604_{10}

Compare this to the conversion to hex, where each group of four digits can be considered independently and converted directly:

(1001011100)_{2}	=	0010	0101	1100_{2}
	=	2	5	C_{16}
	=	25C_{16}

The conversion from hex to binary is equally direct.

=== Other simple conversions ===
Although quaternary (base 4) is little used, it can easily be converted to and from hex or binary. Each hex digit corresponds to a pair of quaternary digits, and each quaternary digit corresponds to a pair of binary digits. In the above example 2 5 C_{16} = 02 11 30_{4}.

The octal (base 8) system can also be converted with relative ease, although not quite as trivially as with bases 2 and 4. Each octal digit corresponds to three binary digits, rather than four. Therefore, we can convert between octal and hex via an intermediate conversion to binary followed by regrouping the binary digits in groups of either three or four.

=== Division-remainder in source base ===
As with all bases there is a simple algorithm for converting a representation of a number to hex by doing integer division and remainder operations in the source base. In theory, this is possible from any base, but for most humans, only decimal and for most computers, only binary (which can be converted by far more efficient methods) can be easily handled with this method.

Let d be the number to represent in hex, and the series h_{i}h_{i−1}...h_{2}h_{1} be the hex digits representing the number.

1. i ← 1
2. h_{i} ← d mod 16
3. d ← (d − h_{i}) / 16
4. If d = 0 (return series h_{i}) else increment i and go to step 2

"16" may be replaced with any other base that may be desired.

The following is a JavaScript implementation of the above algorithm for converting any number to a hex in String representation. Its purpose is to illustrate the above algorithm. To work with data seriously, however, it is much more advisable to work with bitwise operators.

function toHex(d) {
  var r = d % 16;
  if (d - r == 0) {
    return toChar(r);
  }
  return toHex((d - r) / 16) + toChar(r);
}

function toChar(n) {
  const alpha = "0123456789ABCDEF";
  return alpha.charAt(n);
}

=== Conversion through addition and multiplication ===
A hex multiplication table

It is also possible to make the conversion by assigning each place in the source base the hex representation of its place value –before carrying out multiplication and addition to get the final representation. For example, to convert the number B3AD to decimal, one can split the hex number into its digits: B (11_{10}), 3 (3_{10}), A (10_{10}) and D (13_{10}), and then get the final result by multiplying each decimal representation by 16^{p} (p being the corresponding hex digit position, counting from right to left, beginning with 0). In this case, we have that:

B3AD = (11 × 16^{3}) + (3 × 16^{2}) + (10 × 16^{1}) + (13 × 16^{0})

which is 45997 in base 10.

=== Tools for conversion ===
Hexidecimal chart on the control panel of an IBM System/360

Many computer systems provide a calculator utility capable of performing conversions between the various radices frequently including hex.

In Microsoft Windows, the Calculator, on its Programmer mode, allows conversions between hex and other common programming bases.

== Elementary arithmetic ==
Elementary operations such as division can be carried out indirectly through conversion to an alternate numeral system, such as the commonly used decimal system or the binary system where each hex digit corresponds to four binary digits.

Alternatively, one can also perform elementary operations directly within the hex system itself –by relying on its addition/multiplication tables and its corresponding standard algorithms such as long division and the traditional subtraction algorithm.

== Real numbers ==
=== Rational numbers ===
As with other numeral systems, the hex system can be used to represent rational numbers, although repeating expansions are common since sixteen (10_{16}) has only a single prime factor: two.

For any base, 0.1 (or "1/10") is always equivalent to one divided by the representation of that base value in its own number system. Thus, whether dividing one by two for binary or dividing one by sixteen for hex, both of these fractions are written as 0.1. Recurring digits are exhibited when the denominator in lowest terms has a prime factor not found in the radix; thus, when using hex notation, all fractions with denominators that are not a power of two result in an infinite string of recurring digits (such as thirds and fifths). This makes hex (and binary) less convenient than decimal for representing rational numbers since a larger proportion lies outside its range of finite representation. However, because the radix 16 is a perfect square (4^{2}), fractions expressed in hex usually have shorter periods in than decimal ones, and they have an odd period much more often. Moreover, since 16 is an 8th power modulo every odd prime p, the period length in hex of a fraction with denominator p is at most $\dfrac{p-1}{\gcd(p-1,8)}$, and in particular there are no cyclic numbers.

All rational numbers finitely representable in hex are also finitely representable in decimal, duodecimal and sexagesimal: that is, any hex number with a finite number of digits also has a finite number of digits when expressed in those other bases. Conversely, only a fraction of those finitely representable in the latter bases are finitely representable in hex. For example, decimal 0.1 corresponds to the infinite recurring representation 0.19̅ in hex. However, hex is more efficient than duodecimal and sexagesimal for representing fractions with powers of two in the denominator. For example, 0.0625_{10} (one-sixteenth) is equivalent to 0.1_{16}, 0.09_{12}, and 0;3,45_{60}.

n	Decimal Prime factors of: base, b = 10: 2, 5; b − 1 = 9: 3; b + 1 = 11: 11			Hexadecimal Prime factors of: base, b = 16_{10} = 10: 2; b − 1 = 15_{10} = F: 3, 5; b + 1 = 17_{10} = 11: 11		
n	Reciprocal	Prime factors	Positional representation (decimal)	Positional representation (hex)	Prime factors	Reciprocal
2	1/2	2	0.5	0.8	2	1/2
3	1/3	3	0.3333... = 0.3̅	0.5555... = 0.5̅	3	1/3
4	1/4	2	0.25	0.4	2	1/4
5	1/5	5	0.2	0.3̅	5	1/5
6	1/6	2, 3	0.16̅	0.2A̅	2, 3	1/6
7	1/7	7	0.1̅4̅2̅8̅5̅7̅	0.2̅4̅9̅	7	1/7
8	1/8	2	0.125	0.2	2	1/8
9	1/9	3	0.1̅	0.1̅C̅7̅	3	1/9
10	1/10	2, 5	0.1	0.19̅	2, 5	1/A
11	1/11	11	0.0̅9̅	0.1̅7̅4̅5̅D̅	B	1/B
12	1/12	2, 3	0.083̅	0.15̅	2, 3	1/C
13	1/13	13	0.0̅7̅6̅9̅2̅3̅	0.1̅3̅B̅	D	1/D
14	1/14	2, 7	0.07̅1̅4̅2̅8̅5̅	0.12̅4̅9̅	2, 7	1/E
15	1/15	3, 5	0.06̅	0.1̅	3, 5	1/F
16	1/16	2	0.0625	0.1	2	1/10
17	1/17	17	0.0̅5̅8̅8̅2̅3̅5̅2̅9̅4̅1̅1̅7̅6̅4̅7̅	0.0̅F̅	11	1/11
18	1/18	2, 3	0.05̅	0.0E̅3̅8̅	2, 3	1/12
19	1/19	19	0.0̅5̅2̅6̅3̅1̅5̅7̅8̅9̅4̅7̅3̅6̅8̅4̅2̅1̅	0.0̅D̅7̅9̅4̅3̅5̅E̅5̅	13	1/13
20	1/20	2, 5	0.05	0.0C̅	2, 5	1/14
21	1/21	3, 7	0.0̅4̅7̅6̅1̅9̅	0.0̅C̅3̅	3, 7	1/15
22	1/22	2, 11	0.04̅5̅	0.0B̅A̅2̅E̅8̅	2, B	1/16
23	1/23	23	0.0̅4̅3̅4̅7̅8̅2̅6̅0̅8̅6̅9̅5̅6̅5̅2̅1̅7̅3̅9̅1̅3̅	0.0̅B̅2̅1̅6̅4̅2̅C̅8̅5̅9̅	17	1/17
24	1/24	2, 3	0.0416̅	0.0A̅	2, 3	1/18
25	1/25	5	0.04	0.0̅A̅3̅D̅7̅	5	1/19
26	1/26	2, 13	0.03̅8̅4̅6̅1̅5̅	0.09̅D̅8̅	2, D	1/1A
27	1/27	3	0.0̅3̅7̅	0.0̅9̅7̅B̅4̅2̅5̅E̅D̅	3	1/1B
28	1/28	2, 7	0.035̅7̅1̅4̅2̅8̅	0.09̅2̅4̅	2, 7	1/1C
29	1/29	29	0.0̅3̅4̅4̅8̅2̅7̅5̅8̅6̅2̅0̅6̅8̅9̅6̅5̅5̅1̅7̅2̅4̅1̅3̅7̅9̅3̅1̅	0.0̅8̅D̅3̅D̅C̅B̅	1D	1/1D
30	1/30	2, 3, 5	0.03̅	0.08̅	2, 3, 5	1/1E
31	1/31	31	0.0̅3̅2̅2̅5̅8̅0̅6̅4̅5̅1̅6̅1̅2̅9̅	0.0̅8̅4̅2̅1̅	1F	1/1F
32	1/32	2	0.03125	0.08	2	1/20
33	1/33	3, 11	0.0̅3̅	0.0̅7̅C̅1̅F̅	3, B	1/21
34	1/34	2, 17	0.02̅9̅4̅1̅1̅7̅6̅4̅7̅0̅5̅8̅8̅2̅3̅5̅	0.07̅8̅	2, 11	1/22
35	1/35	5, 7	0.02̅8̅5̅7̅1̅4̅	0.0̅7̅5̅	5, 7	1/23
36	1/36	2, 3	0.027̅	0.07̅1̅C̅	2, 3	1/24
37	1/37	37	0.0̅2̅7̅	0.0̅6̅E̅B̅3̅E̅4̅5̅3̅	25	1/25
38	1/38	2, 19	0.02̅6̅3̅1̅5̅7̅8̅9̅4̅7̅3̅6̅8̅4̅2̅1̅0̅5̅	0.06̅B̅C̅A̅1̅A̅F̅2̅8̅	2, 13	1/26
39	1/39	3, 13	0.0̅2̅5̅6̅4̅1̅	0.0̅6̅9̅	3, D	1/27
40	1/40	2, 5	0.025	0.06̅	2, 5	1/28
41	1/41	41	0.0̅2̅4̅3̅9̅	0.0̅6̅3̅E̅7̅	29	1/29
42	1/42	2, 3, 7	0.02̅3̅8̅0̅9̅5̅	0.06̅1̅8̅	2, 3, 7	1/2A
43	1/43	43	0.0̅2̅3̅2̅5̅5̅8̅1̅3̅9̅5̅3̅4̅8̅8̅3̅7̅2̅0̅9̅3̅	0.0̅5̅F̅4̅1̅7̅D̅	2B	1/2B
44	1/44	2, 11	0.022̅7̅	0.05̅D̅1̅7̅4̅	2, B	1/2C
45	1/45	3, 5	0.02̅	0.0̅5̅B̅	3, 5	1/2D
46	1/46	2, 23	0.02̅1̅7̅3̅9̅1̅3̅0̅4̅3̅4̅7̅8̅2̅6̅0̅8̅6̅9̅5̅6̅5̅	0.05̅9̅0̅B̅2̅1̅6̅4̅2̅C̅8̅	2, 17	1/2E
47	1/47	47	0.0̅2̅1̅2̅7̅6̅5̅9̅5̅7̅4̅4̅6̅8̅0̅8̅5̅1̅0̅6̅3̅8̅2̅9̅7̅8̅7̅2̅3̅4̅0̅4̅2̅5̅5̅3̅1̅9̅1̅4̅8̅9̅3̅6̅1̅7̅	0.0̅5̅7̅2̅6̅2̅0̅A̅E̅4̅C̅4̅1̅5̅C̅9̅8̅8̅2̅B̅9̅3̅1̅	2F	1/2F
48	1/48	2, 3	0.02083̅	0.05̅	2, 3	1/30

=== Irrational numbers ===
The table below gives the expansions of some common irrational numbers in decimal and hex.

Number	Positional representation	
Number	Decimal	Hex
√2 (the length of the diagonal of a unit square)	1.414213562373095048... (sequence A002193 in the OEIS)	1.6A09E667F3BCD... (sequence A398406 in the OEIS)
√3 (the length of the diagonal of a unit cube)	1.732050807568877293... (sequence A002194 in the OEIS)	1.BB67AE8584CAA... (sequence A400759 in the OEIS)
√5 (the length of the diagonal of a 1×2 rectangle)	2.236067977499789696... (sequence A002163 in the OEIS)	2.3C6EF372FE95... (sequence A401247 in the OEIS)
φ (phi, the golden ratio = (1+√5)/2)	1.618033988749894848... (sequence A001622 in the OEIS)	1.9E3779B97F4A... (sequence A131602 in the OEIS)
π (pi, the ratio of circumference to diameter of a circle)	3.141592653589793238462643; 383279502884197169399375105... (sequence A000796 in the OEIS)	3.243F6A8885A308D313198A2E0; 3707344A4093822299F31D008... (sequence A062964 in the OEIS)
e (the base of the natural logarithm)	2.718281828459045235... (sequence A001113 in the OEIS)	2.B7E151628AED2A6B... (sequence A170873 in the OEIS)
τ (the Thue–Morse constant)	0.412454033640107597... (sequence A014571 in the OEIS)	0.6996 9669 9669 6996...
γ (the limiting difference between the harmonic series and the natural logarithm)	0.577215664901532860... (sequence A001620 in the OEIS)	0.93C467E37DB0C7A4D1B... (sequence A170874 in the OEIS)

=== Powers ===
The first 16 powers of 2 are below as hex to show relative simplicity compared to decimal representation.

2^{x}	Hex	Decimal
2^{0}	1	1
2^{1}	2	2
2^{2}	4	4
2^{3}	8	8
2^{4}	10	16
2^{5}	20	32
2^{6}	40	64
2^{7}	80	128
2^{8}	100	256
2^{9}	200	512
2^{10}	400	1,024
2^{11}	800	2,048
2^{12}	1,000	4,096
2^{13}	2,000	8,192
2^{14}	4,000	16,384
2^{15}	8,000	32,768
2^{16}	10,000	65,536

== Cultural history ==
The traditional Chinese units of measurement were base-16. For example, one jīn (斤) in the old system equals sixteen taels. The suanpan (Chinese abacus) can be used to perform hex calculations such as additions and subtractions.

As with the duodecimal system, there have been occasional attempts to promote hex as the preferred numeral system. These attempts often propose specific pronunciation and symbols for the individual numerals. Some proposals unify standard measures so that they are multiples of 16. An early such proposal was put forward by John W. Nystrom in Project of a New System of Arithmetic, Weight, Measure and Coins: Proposed to be called the Tonal System, with Sixteen to the Base, published in 1862. Nystrom among other things suggested hexadecimal time, which subdivides a day by 16, so that there are 16 "hours" (or "10 tims", pronounced tontim) in a day.

The word hexadecimal is first recorded in 1952. It is macaronic in the sense that it combines Greek ἕξ (hex) "six" with Latinate -decimal. The all-Latin alternative sexadecimal (compare the word sexagesimal for base 60) is older, and sees at least occasional use from the late 19th century. It is still in use in the 1950s in Bendix documentation. Schwartzman (1994) argues that use of sexadecimal may have been avoided because of its suggestive abbreviation to sex. Many western languages since the 1960s have adopted terms equivalent in formation to hexadecimal (e.g. French hexadécimal, Italian esadecimale, Romanian hexazecimal, Serbian хексадецимални, etc.) but others have introduced terms which substitute native words for "sixteen" (e.g. Greek δεκαεξαδικός, Icelandic sextándakerfi, Russian шестнадцатеричной etc.).

Terminology and notation did not become settled until the end of the 1960s. In 1969, Donald Knuth argued that the etymologically correct term would be senidenary, or possibly sedenary, a Latinate term intended to convey "grouped by 16" modelled on binary, ternary, quaternary, etc. According to Knuth's argument, the correct terms for decimal and octal arithmetic would be denary and octonary, respectively. Alfred B. Taylor used senidenary in his mid-1800s work on alternative number bases, although he rejected base 16 because of its "incommodious number of digits".

The now-current notation using the letters A to F establishes itself as the de facto standard beginning in 1966, in the wake of the publication of the Fortran IV manual for IBM System/360, which (unlike earlier variants of Fortran) recognizes a standard for entering hexadecimal constants. As noted above, alternative notations were used by NEC (1960) and The Pacific Data Systems 1020 (1964). The standard adopted by IBM seems to have become widely adopted by 1968, when Bruce Alan Martin in his letter to the editor of the CACM complains that

With the ridiculous choice of letters A, B, C, D, E, F as hexadecimal number symbols adding to already troublesome problems of distinguishing octal (or hex) numbers from decimal numbers (or variable names), the time is overripe for reconsideration of our number symbols. This should have been done before poor choices gelled into a de facto standard!

Martin's argument was that use of numerals 0 to 9 in nondecimal numbers "imply to us a base-ten place-value scheme": "Why not use entirely new symbols (and names) for the seven or fifteen nonzero digits needed in octal or hex. Even use of the letters A through P would be an improvement, but entirely new symbols could reflect the binary nature of the system". He also argued that "re-using alphabetic letters for numerical digits represents a gigantic backward step from the invention of distinct, non-alphabetic glyphs for numerals sixteen centuries ago" (as Brahmi numerals, and later in a Hindu–Arabic numeral system), and that the recent ASCII standards (ASA X3.4-1963 and USAS X3.4-1968) "should have preserved six code table positions following the ten decimal digits -- rather than needlessly filling these with punctuation characters" (":;<=>?") that might have been placed elsewhere among the 128 available positions.

== Base16 ==
Base16 is a binary to text encoding in the family that also contains Base32, Base58, and Base64. Data is broken into 4-bit sequences, and each value (0-15) is encoded as a character. Although any 16 characters could be used, in practice, the ASCII digits "0"–"9" and letters "A"–"F" (or "a"–"f") are used to align with the typical notation for hex numbers.

Support for Base16 encoding is ubiquitous in modern computing. It is the basis for the W3C standard for URL percent encoding, where a character is replaced with a percent sign "%" and its Base16-encoded form. Most modern programming languages directly include support for formatting and parsing Base16-encoded numbers.

Advantages of Base16 encoding include:

- Most programming languages have facilities to parse ASCII-encoded hex
- Being exactly half a byte, 4-bits is easier to process than the 5 or 6 bits of Base32 and Base64, respectively
- The notation is well-known and easily understood without needing a symbol lookup table
- Many CPU architectures have dedicated instructions that allow access to a half-byte (aka nibble), making it more efficient in hardware than Base32 and Base64

Disadvantages include:

- Space efficiency is only 50%, since each 4-bit value from the original data will be encoded as an 8-bit byte; in contrast, Base32 and Base64 encodings have a space efficiency of 63% and 75% respectively
- Complexity of accepting both upper and lower case letters

== See also ==
- Bailey–Borwein–Plouffe formula – Formula for computing the nth base-16 digit of π
- Hex dump – Hexadecimal view of computer data
- Hex editor – Editor for byte manipulation
- Hexadecimal time – Base 16 time format proposed in 1863
- Hexspeak – Novelty form of variant English spelling
- IBM hexadecimal floating-point – Number representation
- P notation – Concise notation for large or small numbers
