= Permian (disambiguation) =

The Permian is a geological period and the sixth and final period of the Paleozoic era.

Permian or Permians may also refer to:

- Permian Basin (Europe), a sedimentary basin in Europe
- Permian Basin (North America), a sedimentary basin in North America
- Permian High School, a school in Odessa, Texas
- Permians, a branch of Uralic peoples

== See also ==
- Perm (disambiguation)
- Permic languages
- Permsky (disambiguation)
