= Bibi-binary =

Hexadecimal number system

Each Bibi digit is formed from a square arranging the 1-bits in its binary representation. If only a single bit is 1 a vertical line runs through the centre and ends in that bit's corner; otherwise it relies on the order of the positions of the 1-bits. When there are exactly two 1-bits, the line passes round the centre. The forms are rounded when there are less than three 1-bits, and use sharp corners when three or four of the bits are 1.

The Bibi-binary system for numeric notation (French: système Bibi-binaire, or abbreviated "système Bibi") is a hexadecimal numeral system first described in 1968 by singer/mathematician Robert "Boby" Lapointe (1922–1972). At the time, it attracted the attention of André Lichnerowicz, then engaged in studies at the University of Lyon.

The notational system directly and logically encodes the binary representations of the digits in a hexadecimal (base sixteen) numeral. In place of the Arabic numerals 0–9 and letters A–F currently used in writing hexadecimal numerals, it presents sixteen newly devised symbols (thus evading any risk of confusion with the decimal system). The graphical and phonetic conception of these symbols is meant to render the use of the Bibi-binary "language" simple and fast.

The description of the language first appeared in Les Cerveaux non-humains ("Non-human brains"), and the system can also be found in Boby Lapointe by Huguette Long Lapointe.

== Name ==
The central observation driving this system is that sixteen can be written as 2 to the power of 2, to the power of 2. As we use the term binary for numbers written in base two, Lapointe reasoned that one could also say "bi-binary" for base four, and thus "bibi-binary" for base 16. Its name may also be a pun, as the word bibi in French is slang for "me" or "myself"; various forms of word play were at the centre of Lapointe's artistic œuvre.

== Pronunciation ==
In addition to unique graphical representations, Lapointe also devised a pronunciation for each of the sixteen digits. Using four consonants (HBKD) and four vowels (OAEI), one obtains sixteen combinations:

HO, HA, HE, HI, BO, BA, BE, BI, KO, KA, KE, KI, DO, DA, DE, DI.

To express any number, it suffices to enumerate the (hexadecimal) digits that make it up. For example: the number written as "2000" in decimal, which translates to "7D0" in conventionally-written hexadecimal, would in Bibi-binary be spoken aloud as "BIDAHO".
