= Binary clock =

Clock that displays the time in a binary format

GMT at page generation (Update)
| 24-hour time | 06:09:29 |
| Expressed in Binary | 110:1001:11101 |
| "True" Binary Time (Seconds since start of day) | 0101011010011001 |

A binary clock is a clock that displays the time of day in a binary format. Originally, such clocks showed each decimal digit of sexagesimal time as a binary value, but presently binary clocks also exist which display hours, minutes, and seconds as binary numbers. Most binary clocks are digital, although analog varieties exist. True binary clocks also exist, which indicate the time by successively halving the day, instead of using hours, minutes, or seconds. Similar clocks, based on Gray coded binary, also exist.

== Binary-coded decimal clocks ==
Reading a binary-coded decimal clock: Add the values of each column of LEDs to get six decimal digits. There are two columns each for hours, minutes and seconds.

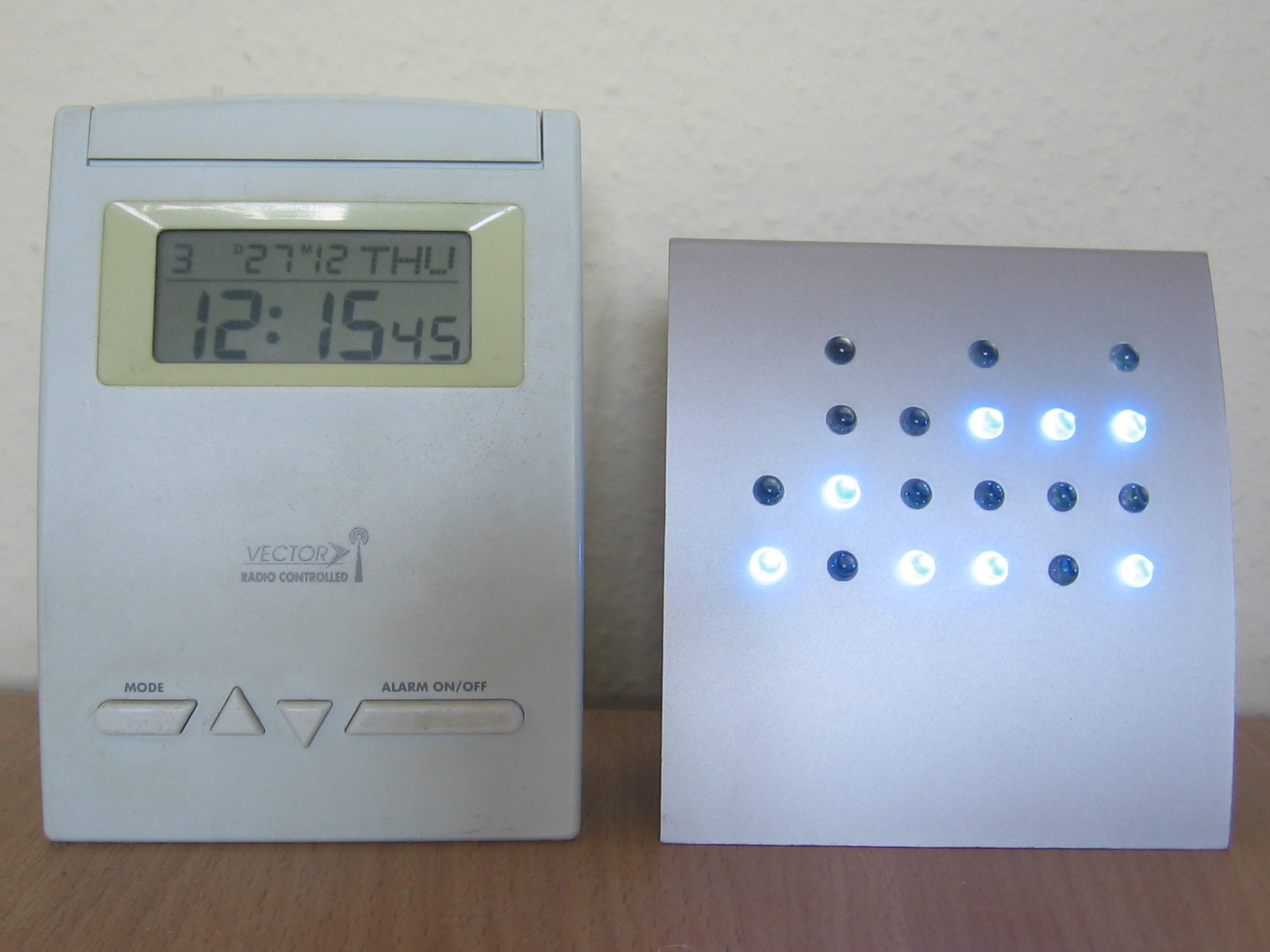
Both clocks read 12:15:45.

Most common binary clocks use six columns of LEDs to represent zeros and ones. Each column represents a single decimal digit, a format known as binary-coded decimal (BCD). The bottom row in each column represents 1 (or 2^{0}), with each row above representing higher powers of two, up to 2^{3} (or 8).

To read each individual digit in the time, the user adds the values that each illuminated LED represents, then reads these from left to right. The first two columns represent the hour, the next two represent the minute and the last two represent the second. Since zero digits are not illuminated, the positions of each digit must be memorized if the clock is to be usable in the dark.

== Binary-coded sexagesimal clocks ==
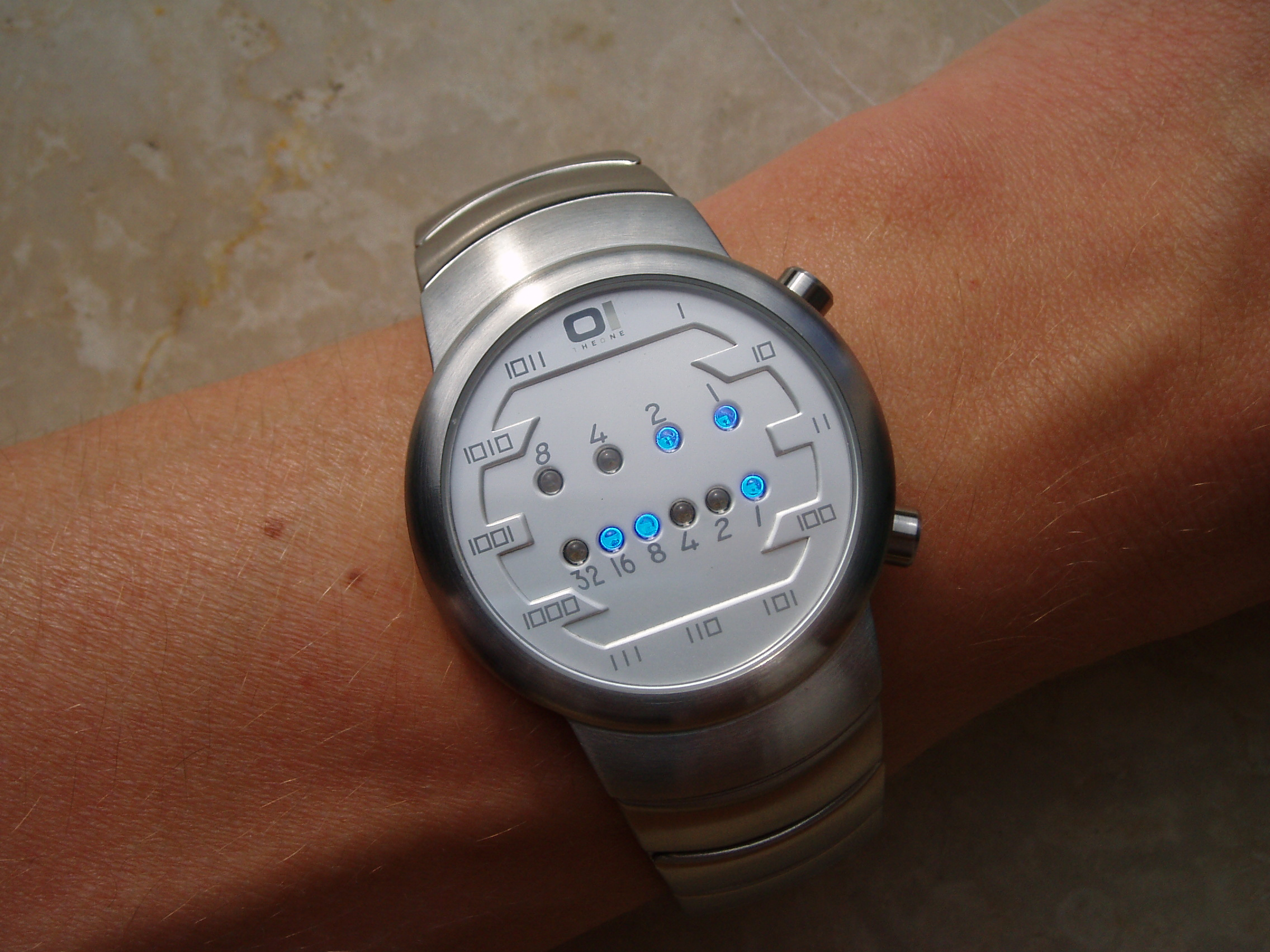
Time Technology's Samui Moon binary-coded sexagesimal wristwatch. This clock reads 3:25.

Binary clocks that display time in binary-coded sexagesimal also exist. Instead of representing each digit of traditional sexagesimal time with one binary number, each component of traditional sexagesimal time is represented with one binary number, that is, using up to 6 bits instead of only 4.

For 24-hour binary-coded sexagesimal clocks, there are 11 or 17 LED lights to show the time. There are 5 LEDs to show the hours, there are 6 LEDs to show the minutes, and there are 6 LEDs to show the seconds (which aren't used in clocks with 11 LED lights).

| | Hours | Minutes | Seconds |
| 32 | | 1 | 1 |
| 16 | 0 | 0 | 1 |
| 8 | 1 | 0 | 0 |
| 4 | 0 | 1 | 0 |
| 2 | 1 | 0 | 0 |
| 1 | 0 | 1 | 1 |
| | 10 | 37 | 49 |

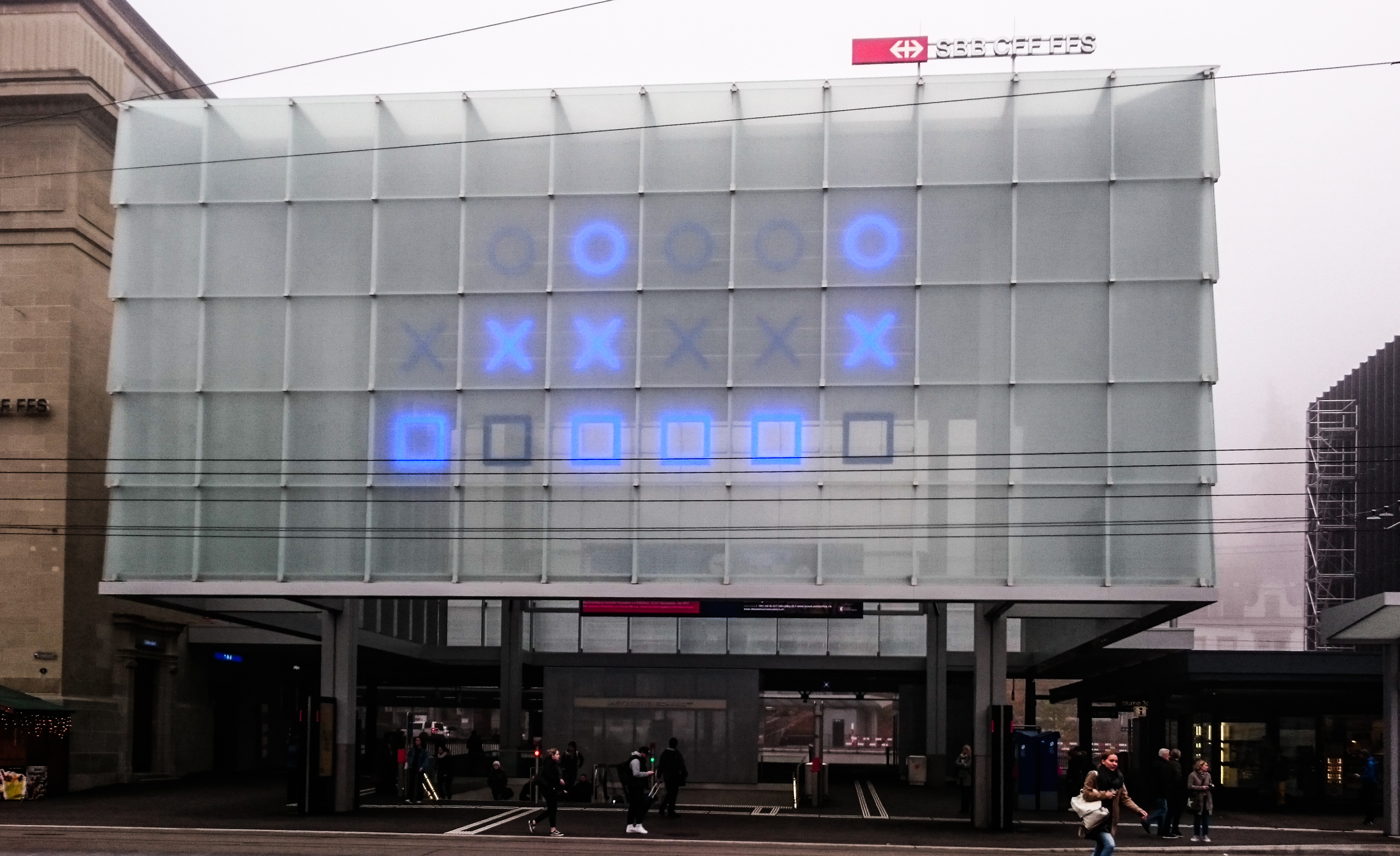
Binary large-scale electronic clock, designed by the artist Norbert Möslang, to indicate the time of day on 3 lines in hours, minutes, seconds on the face of St. Gallen railway station, St. Gallen, Switzerland. Time indicated is 9 o'clock 25 minutes 46 seconds

A format exists also where hours, minutes and seconds are shown on three lines instead of columns as binary numbers.

== Binary time ==
Less commonly, the day could be divided in binary fractions, such as ½ day, ¼ day, etc. The clock would show the time in 16 bits, where the smallest unit would be exactly 1/65536 day, or 675/512 (about 1.318) seconds. An analog format also exists of this type. However, it is much easier to write and express this in hexadecimal, which would be hexadecimal time.
