= Hexadecimal time =

Base 16 time format proposed in 1863

UTC-00:00 Hex Triplet (Update)
Base 60	14:02:59
Base 16	95_DD_1B

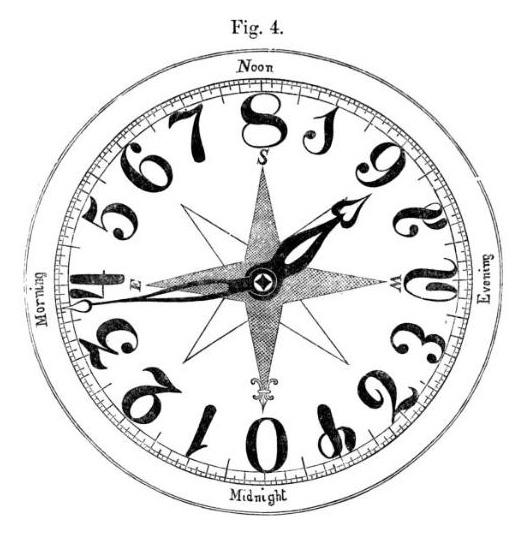
Nystrom's tonal clock-face. The proposed figures on the right are based on rotations of those on the left (assigning value 10 to symbol 9).

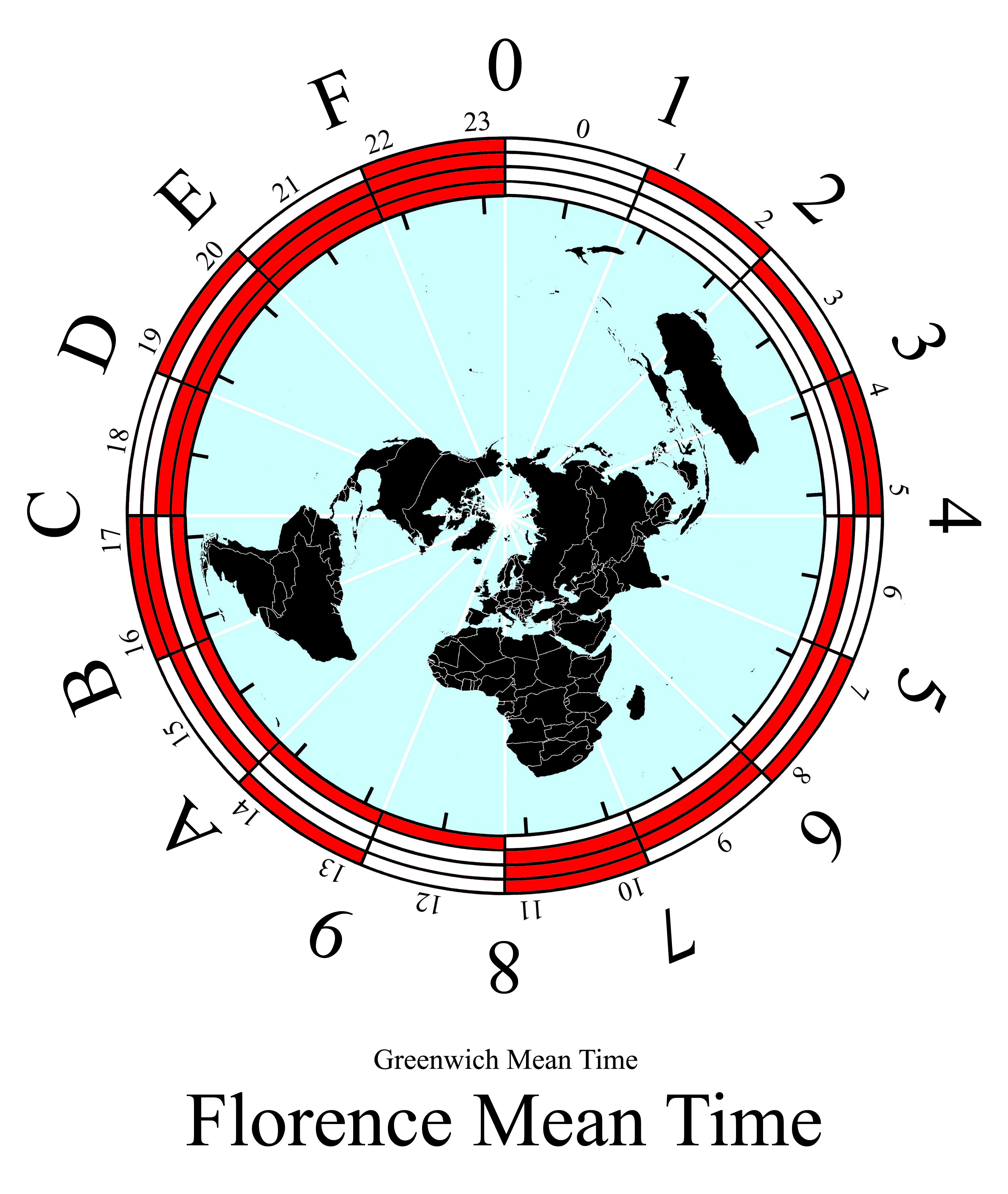
A hexadecimal clock-face (using the Florence meridian)

Hexadecimal time is the representation of the time of day as a hexadecimal number in the interval [0, 1].

The day is divided into 10_{16} (16_{10}) hexadecimal hours, each hour into 100_{16} (256_{10}) hexadecimal minutes, and each minute into 10_{16} (16_{10}) hexadecimal seconds.

== History ==
This time format was proposed by the Swedish-American engineer John W. Nystrom in 1863 as part of his tonal system.

In 1997, the American Mark Vincent Rogers of Intuitor proposed a similar system of hexadecimal time and implemented it in JavaScript as the Hexclock.

== Implementation ==
A day is unity, or 1, and any fraction thereof can be shown with digits to the right of the hexadecimal separator. So the day begins at midnight with .0000 and one hexadecimal second after midnight is .0001. Noon is .8000 (one half), one hexadecimal second before was .7FFF and one hexadecimal second before next midnight will be .FFFF.

Hexadecimal time may also be formatted with an underscore separating hexadecimal hours, minutes and seconds; in full mathematical format this follows hex triplet web color scheme.

Hex	Hex (Boardman)	ISO 8601	Comment
.0100	0_10_0	00:05:37.5	
.0200	0_20_0	00:11:15	
.0400	0_40_0	00:22:30	
.0800	0_80_0	00:45:00	
.1000	1_00_0	01:30:00	1.5:24 = 1:16 = 0.1
.8000	8_00_0	12:00:00	12:24 = 8:16 = 0.8
.F000	F_00_0	22:30:00	22.5:24 = 15:16 = 0.F
.F800	F_80_0	23:15:00	

=== Conversions ===
Hex		hexsec base 16		hexsec base 10		Traditional
1 day	=	10000	=	65536	=	24 h
1 hexadecimal hour	=	1000	=	4096	=	1 h 30 min
1 hexadecimal tertiary or maxime	=	100	=	256	=	5 min 37.5 s
1 hexadecimal minute	=	10	=	16	=	21.09375 s
1 hexadecimal second	=	1	=	1	=	1.318359375 s
1 second	=	0.C22E4	=	0.75851	=	1 s

== See also ==
- Binary time
- Decimal time
- Metric time
