= Boby Lapointe =

French singer-songwriter

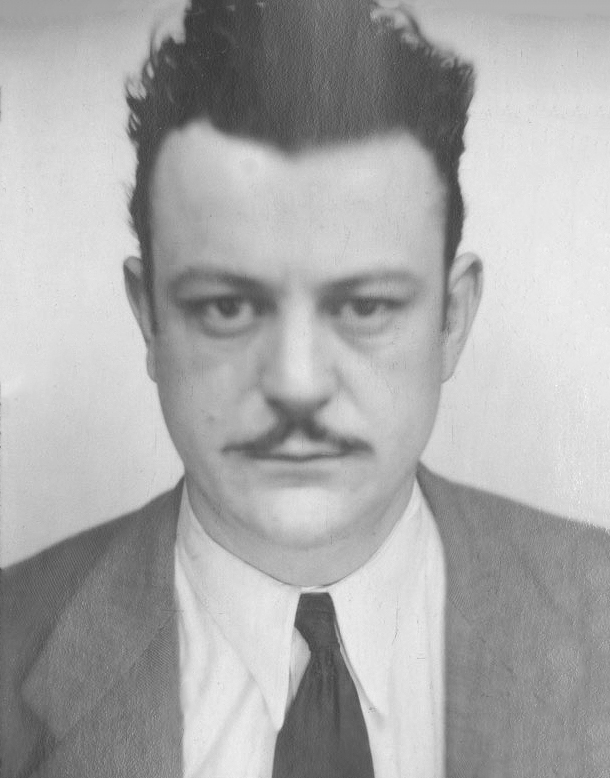
- Identity card photo of Boby Lapointe
- Born: Robert Jean-François Joseph Pascal Lapointe; 16 April 1922; Pézenas, Hérault, France
- Died: 29 June 1972 (aged 50); Pézenas, Hérault, France

Robert Jean-François Joseph Pascal Lapointe (French pronunciation: [ʁɔbɛʁ ʒɑ̃ fʁɑ̃swa ʒozɛf paskal lapwɛ̃t]; 16 April 1922 – 29 June 1972), better known by his stage name Boby Lapointe (French: [bɔbi lapwɛ̃t]), was a French singer, songwriter and actor. As a singer and songwriter, he was noted for his humorous texts, alliterations and plays on words.

== Biography ==
Lapointe was born in Pézenas, in the Hérault département of southern France. A brilliant pupil, he prepared for the entrance exam to the Centrale (engineering school) and Sup-Aero at Montpellier, but was conscripted into the Youth Building Projects in 1942 and sent to Linz, Austria, in 1943 for compulsory work service. He escaped the same year, and found work as a diver in La Ciotat, a suburb of Marseille, in 1944.

In 1946, he married Colette Maclaud. They had two children, Ticha (born 1948) and Jacky (1950).

His first published work, Les douze chants d'un imbécile, appeared in 1951. He moved to Paris and opened a fashion and baby clothes shop, still writing and producing plays. Later, he switched to being a fitter of TV aerials and began singing.

His fame grew when the actor Bourvil sang Lapointe's song Aragon et Castille in the 1954 film Poisson d'avril. In 1960, film director François Truffaut offered him a part in Tirez sur le Pianiste in which he sang Framboise, accompanied by Charles Aznavour on piano. This marked the start of a career that saw Lapointe perform at major venues throughout France. His joyful character led him to build friendships with the likes of Anne Sylvestre, Raymond Devos, Jacques Brel and Georges Brassens.

Lapointe was also a math enthusiast, and developed the bibi-binary system (also known in French as the système Bibi) in 1968.

== Gallery ==
The town of Pézenas contains a monument to Lapointe (in the Place Boby Lapointe) and 7 carved stone sculptures relating to the man and his songs.

== List of songs ==
- Aragon et Castille
- Framboise
- Marcelle
- Insomnie
- Le Poisson fa
- Embrouille minet
- Petit homme qui vit d'espoir
- Bobo Léon
- Tchita
- Le Beau voyage
- L'Ange
- Le Troubadour (ou la crue du Tage)
- La Fleur bleue contondante
- La Fille du pécheur
- Eh ! Toto
- L'Hélicon
- Léna
- La Peinture à l'huile
- Eh ! V'nez les potes
- J'ai fantaisie
- Leçon de guitare sommaire
- Ta Katie t'a quitté
- Je joue du violon tzigane
- T'as pas, t'as pas tout dit
- Le Papa du papa
- Aubade à Lydie en do
- Lumière Tango (Loumiere's Tango)
- From Two to Two
- Saucisson de cheval n° 1
- Saucisson de cheval n° 2
- L'ami Zantrop
- La Banane anana
- L'Été où est-il ?
- La Question ne se pose pas
- Andrea c'est toi
- L'Idole et l'enfant
- Comprend qui peut
- Monsieur l'agent
- Méli-mélodie
- Diba-diba
- Le Tube de toilette
- Madam' Mado m'a dit
- Moi, le philosophe et l'esthète
- La Maman des poissons
- Revanche
- Sentimental bourreau
- Ça va ça vient
- In the Desert
- Mon père et ses verres
- Je suis né au Chili
- Le Tigre

== Filmography ==
Filmography as actor:

- 1960: Shoot the Piano Player, as The Singer
- 1970: L'ardoise, as The Farmer
- 1970: The Things of Life, as the driver of the animal transporter
- 1970: Chapaqua's Gold, as Chapagua
- 1971: Max et les ferrailleurs, as Lui Serafino / 'P'tit Lu'
- 1971: Les Assassins de l'ordre, as Louis Casso
- 1971: Qu'est-ce qui fait courir les crocodiles ?, as Honoré
- 1971: Appointment in Bray, as the inn keeper
- 1971: The Widow Couderc, as Désiré
