= Permsky =

Permsky (masculine), Permskaya (feminine), or Permskoye (neuter) may refer to:

- Perm Krai (Permsky krai), a federal subject of Russia
- Permsky District, a district of Perm Krai, Russia
- Perm Oblast (Permskaya oblast), a former federal subject of Russia
- Permsky (Permskaya, Permskoye), name of several rural localities in Russia:
  - Permsky (rural locality), a settlement in Toguchinsky District of Novosibirsk Oblast
  - Permskaya (rural locality), a village in Omutninsky District of Kirov Oblast
  - Permskoye, a selo in Olginsky District of Primorsky Krai

== See also ==
- Perm (disambiguation)
