= John W. Nystrom =

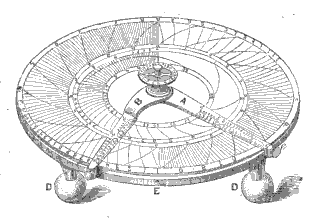
Nystrom's Calculator

John Williams Nystrom (Swedish: Johan Vilhelm Nyström) (1825–1885 May 11) was a Swedish American civil engineer, inventor, and writer. He served as an assistant Secretary and Chief Engineer of the United States Navy during the American Civil War.

== Background ==
He was born Johan Vilhelm Nyström in Småland province, Sweden. He received his engineering degree from the Royal Institute of Technology (Kungliga Tekniska högskolan) in Stockholm, Sweden. He emigrated to the United States in the 1840s, and became an American citizen in 1854. He maintained residence in Philadelphia, Pennsylvania, where he died on 11 May 1885.

== Inventions and patents ==
Nystrom received many patents for inventions such as a marine steam engine, a refrigerator, and calculating machines. His slide ruler invention (U. S. patent #7961) was filed with the United States Patent Office on 4 March 1851.

Nystrom is most notable for his proposal to switch from decimal to hexadecimal as defined in his 1862 publication titled Project of a New System of Arithmetic, Weight, Measure and Coins, Proposed to be Called the Tonal System, with Sixteen to the Base.

== Numeral systems ==
=== Tonal system (hexadecimal) ===
In 1859, Nystrom proposed a hexadecimal (base 16) system of notation, arithmetic, and metrology called the Tonal system. In addition to new weights and measures, his proposal included a new calendar with sixteen months, a new system of coinage, and a hexadecimal clock with sixteen hours in a day.

I am not afraid, or do not hesitate, to advocate a binary system of arithmetic and metrology. I know I have nature on my side; if I do not succeed to impress upon you its utility and great importance to mankind, it will reflect that much less credit upon our generation, upon scientific men and philosophers.

— John W. Nystrom, ca. 1863

=== Duodenal system (duodecimal) ===
In 1875, Nystrom proposed a new duodecimal (base 12) system of notation, arithmetic, and metrology called the Duodenal system as an appendix in his book A New Treatise on Elements of Mechanics Establishing Strict Precision in the Meaning of Dynamical Terms.

== Selected works ==
- A treatise on screw propellers and their steam-engines, with practical rules and examples how to calculate and construct the same ... accompanied with A treatise on bodies in motion in fluid ... also, a full description of a calculating machine (Philadelphia: H. C. Baird. 1852)
- Project of a new system of arithmetic, weight, measure and coins, proposed to be called the tonal system, with sixteen to the base (Philadelphia: J.B. Lippincott & Co.; London: Trubner & Co. 1862)
- On technological education and the construction of ships and screw propellers, for naval and marine engineers (Philadelphia: H.C. Baird. 1866)
- Informe al supremo gobierno del Perú, sobre una espedición al interior de la república (Lima: E. Prugue. 1868) Spanish
- Pocket-book of mechanics and engineering (Philadelphia: J. B. Lippincott & co.; London: Trübner & Co. 1869)
- Principles of dynamics (Philadelphia: J. P. Murphy, printer. 1874)
- A new treatise on elements of mechanics establishing strict precision in the meaning of dynamical terms accompanied with an appendix on duodenal arithmetic and metrology (Philadelphia: Porter & Coates. 1875)
- A new treatise on steam engineering, physical properties of permanent gases, and of different kinds of vapor (Philadelphia: London: J.B. Lippincott & Co. 1876)
