= PERM (computer) =

Early German computer

PERM (German: Programmierbare (Programmgesteuerte) Elektronische Rechenanlage München, lit. 'Munich Programmable (Program Controlled) Electronic Computing System') is a stored-program-controlled electronic computer, built in Munich under the auspices of Hans Piloty and Robert Sauer 1952–1956. Some jokingly called it Pilotys erstes RechenMonster ('Piloty's first calculating monster'). It weighed several tons.

The machine is now displayed in the informatics (computer science) exhibition of the Deutsches Museum in Munich.
