= Science and technology in Russia =

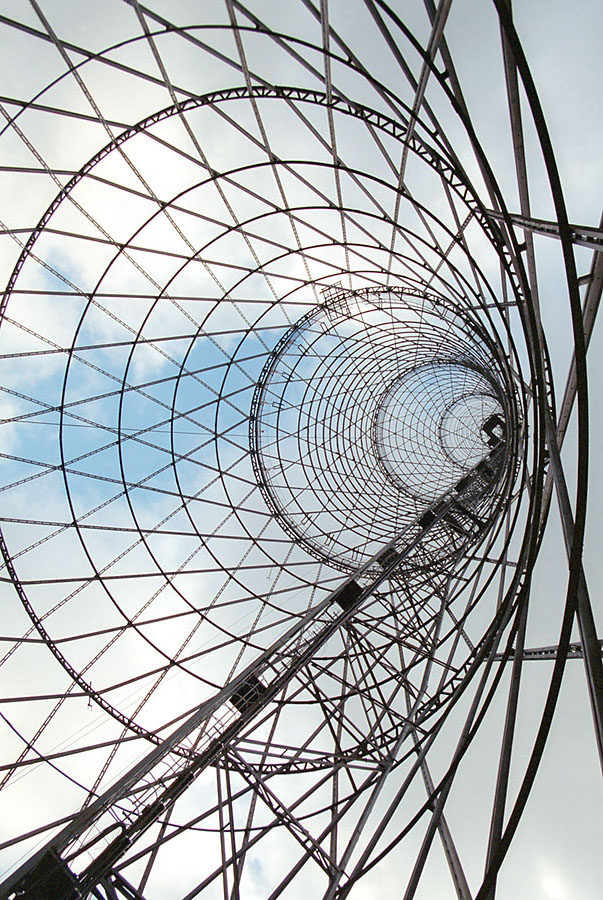
Shukhov Tower in Moscow

Science and technology in Russia have developed rapidly since the Age of Enlightenment, when Peter the Great founded the Russian Academy of Sciences and Saint Petersburg State University and polymath Mikhail Lomonosov founded the Moscow State University, establishing a strong native tradition in learning and innovation.

In the 19th and 20th centuries, Russia produced many notable scientists, making important contributions in physics, astronomy, mathematics, computing, chemistry, biology, geology and geography. Russian inventors and engineers excelled in such areas as electrical engineering, shipbuilding, aerospace, weaponry, communications, IT, nuclear technology and space technology.

The crisis of the 1990s led to the drastic reduction of state support for science and technology, leading many Russian scientists and university graduates to move to Western Europe or the United States. In the 2000s, on the wave of a new economic boom, the situation has improved, and the Russian government launched a campaign aimed into modernisation and innovation with mixed success.

== History ==
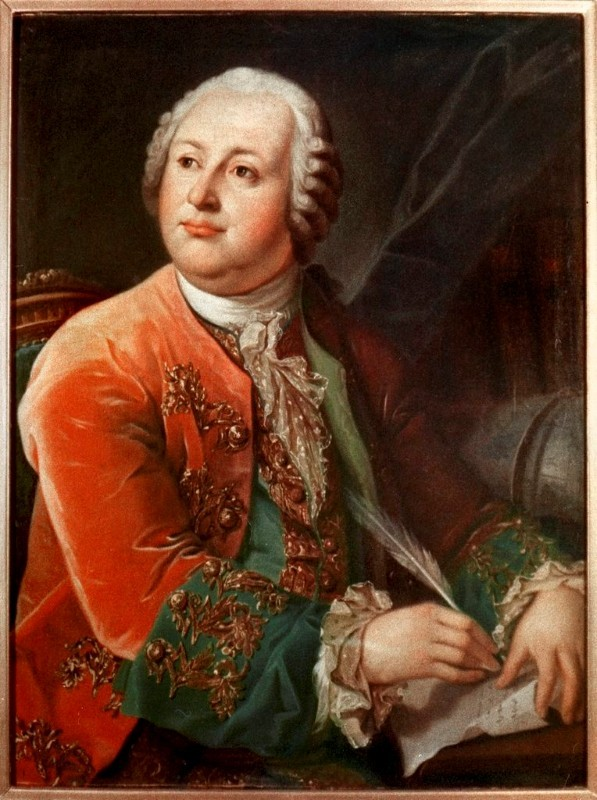
Mikhail Lomonosov, Russian polymath scientist, inventor, poet and artist, the founder of Moscow State University

At the start of the 18th century the reforms of Peter the Great (founder of the Russian Academy of Sciences and Saint Petersburg State University) and the work of such champions as polymath Mikhail Lomonosov (the founder of Moscow State University) gave a great boost to the development of science and innovation in Russia.

Many famous Russian scientists and inventors were émigrés, like Igor Sikorsky, credited with the invention of the first helicopters, Vladimir Zworykin, often called the father of TV, chemist Ilya Prigogine, noted for his work on dissipative structures and complex systems (1977 Nobel Prize for Chemistry), economists Simon Kuznets (1971 Nobel Prize) and Wassily Leontief (1973 Nobel Prize), physicist Georgiy Gamov (an author of the Big Bang theory), engineer Alexander M. Poniatoff, who created the world's first rotary head recorder and social scientist Pitirim Sorokin who played an important role in development of sociology in the US. Many foreigners such as Leonhard Euler and Alfred Nobel worked in Russia for a long time.

Despite many technological achievements in the 19th and 20th centuries, since the time of Brezhnev stagnation Russia has lagged significantly behind the West in a number of technologies, especially those concerning energy conservation and consumer goods production. The crisis of the 1990s led to the drastic reduction of state support for science. Many Russian scientists and university graduates left Russia for Europe or United States; this migration is known as a "brain drain".

In the 2000s, on the wave of a new economic boom, the situation in the Russian science and technology has improved, and the government launched a campaign to encourage modernisation and innovation. Russian President Dmitry Medvedev formulated the top five priorities for the country's technological development: energy efficiency, IT (including both common products and the products combined with space technology), nuclear energy and pharmaceuticals. Some progress already has been achieved, with Russia's having nearly completed GLONASS, the only global satellite navigation system apart from American GPS, European Galileo and Chinese BeiDou, and Russia's being the only country constructing mobile nuclear plants.

In 2022, due to the Russo-Ukrainian War, tens of thousands of tech workers fled Russia causing a brain drain. In 2024, the website of the science journal Science reported that Russia has experienced a multi-year brain drain in the science profession and that salaries are falling in the Russian scientific community. In addition, the Russo-Ukrainian War caused many international scientific agreements between Russia and Western countries to be ended, including those related to the utilization of scientific infrastructure. Russia ranked 60th in the Global Innovation Index in 2025, down from 45th in 2021.

== Science and education ==
=== Physics ===
The Russian physics school began to develop after Lomonosov who proposed the law of conservation of matter preceding the energy conservation law. Early in the development of electrodynamics, Vasily Petrov discovered the electric arc effect in 1802 and Heinrich Lenz discovered the important law named in his honor. Nikolay Umov discovered a fundamental concept of the Umov–Poynting vector and was the first scientist to indicate an interrelation between mass and energy, proposing the formula $E=kmc^2$ as early as in 1873. Alexander Popov was among the inventors of radio.

During the 20th century, Russian and Soviet scientists were among the world leaders in physics. Alexander Friedmann was the first scientist to propose an expanding universe model in 1922 which greatly influenced cosmology in the 20th century. Georgiy Gamov proposed the theory of the alpha decay of a nucleus via tunnelling (1928) and was an author of the Big Bang theory. Dmitri Ivanenko was the first to propose the proton-neutron model of atomic nuclei (1932) and nuclear shell model (1932).

Nikolay Bogolyubov suggested a triplet quark model, introducing a new quantum degree of freedom (later called as color charge) for quarks and formulated a microscopic theory of superconductivity. Lev Landau made fundamental contributions to many areas of theoretical physics, and was awarded the Nobel Prize in Physics in 1962. Nikolai Basov and Alexander Prokhorov were co-inventors of lasers and masers, winning the Nobel Prize in Physics 1964. Igor Tamm, Andrei Sakharov and Lev Artsimovich developed the idea of tokamak for controlled nuclear fusion and created its first prototype, which finally led to the modern ITER project. Yevgeny Zavoisky discovered electron paramagnetic resonance, which plays an important role in studying chemical species. Zhores Alferov greatly contributed to the creation of modern heterostructure physics and electronics which find many applications in modern life: from CD and DVD players to fiber optic transceivers (Nobel Prize in Physics, 2000). In 2010 two Russian-born and educated physicists Konstantin Novoselov and Andre Geim were awarded with the Nobel Prize in Physics for their work in graphene, a material which may have important applications in electronics, aviation and medicine.

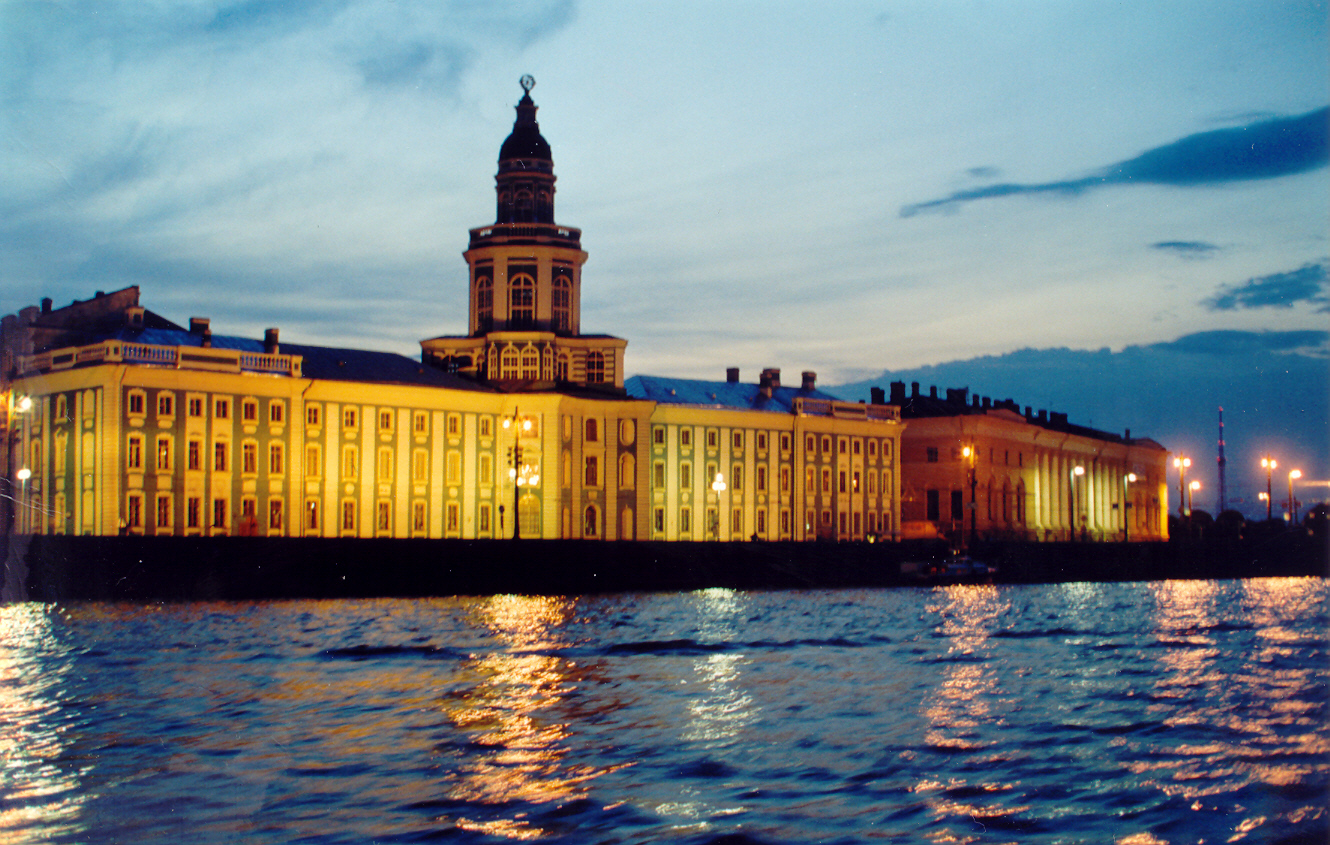
Kunstkamera building, the first headquarters of the Russian Academy of Sciences in Saint Petersburg

A number of achievements of Russian/Soviet scientists remained unknown to general public due to security considerations or bureaucratic obstacles. For example, the first design of magnetic resonance imaging was proposed by Vladislav Ivanov in 1960 but was not realized at that time.

=== Mathematics ===
In mathematics Nikolai Lobachevsky, a Copernicus of geometry, founded the non-Euclidean geometry playing an important role in modern physics. In the 19th century international recognition was also gained by such mathematicians as Mikhail Ostrogradsky and Sofia Kovalevskaya, the first major Russian female mathematician, responsible for important original contributions to analysis, differential equations and mechanics, and the first woman appointed to a full professorship in Northern Europe. Yevgraf Fyodorov was a founder of the modern structural crystallography (Fedorov group). After such prominent scientists as Chebyshev the Russian mathematical school became one of the most influential in the world and was represented by numerous figures greatly contributing to different fields of mathematics, physics and computing sciences. Chebyshev's students included Aleksandr Lyapunov who founded the modern stability theory (lately developed by such scientists as Aleksandr Andronov and Vladimir Arnold), and Andrey Markov who developed the theory of Markov chains, playing a central role in information sciences and modern applied mathematics.

At the beginning of the 20th century Nikolai Zhukovsky and Sergei Chaplygin were among founding fathers of the modern aero- and hydrodynamics and Vladimir Kotelnikov was a pioneer in information theory by independently proposing the fundamental sampling theorem. Andrei Kolmogorov, a leading mathematician of the 20th century, developed the foundation of the modern theory of probability and made other key contributions to broadest range of mathematical branches, such as turbulence, mathematical logic, topology, differential equations, set theory, automata theory, information theory, theory of algorithms, dynamical systems, stochastic processes, theory of integration, classical mechanics, mathematical linguistics, mathematical biology and applied sciences. Israel Gelfand is credited with many important discoveries in algebra, topology, mathematical physics and applied sciences. Sergei Sobolev developed the theory of Sobolev space which played an extremely important role in formation of modern mathematical views and introduced the notion of distributions generalizing ideas of Newton and Leibniz.

Such mathematicians as Lev Pontryagin, who made major contributions to topology and functional analysis and a founder of the modern optimal control theory, Andrey Tychonoff, who was the author of the "central theorem" of general topology, Pavel Alexandrov, a very important figure in topology of the 20th century, and many others made fundamental contributions to different fields of mathematics. Nine Soviet/Russian mathematicians were awarded with Fields Medal, a most prestigious award in mathematics. Recently Grigori Perelman was offered the first ever Clay Millennium Prize Problems award for his final proof of the Poincaré conjecture in 2002.

=== Chemistry ===
Lomonosov was the first Russian chemist, among others he was the founder of the science of glass.

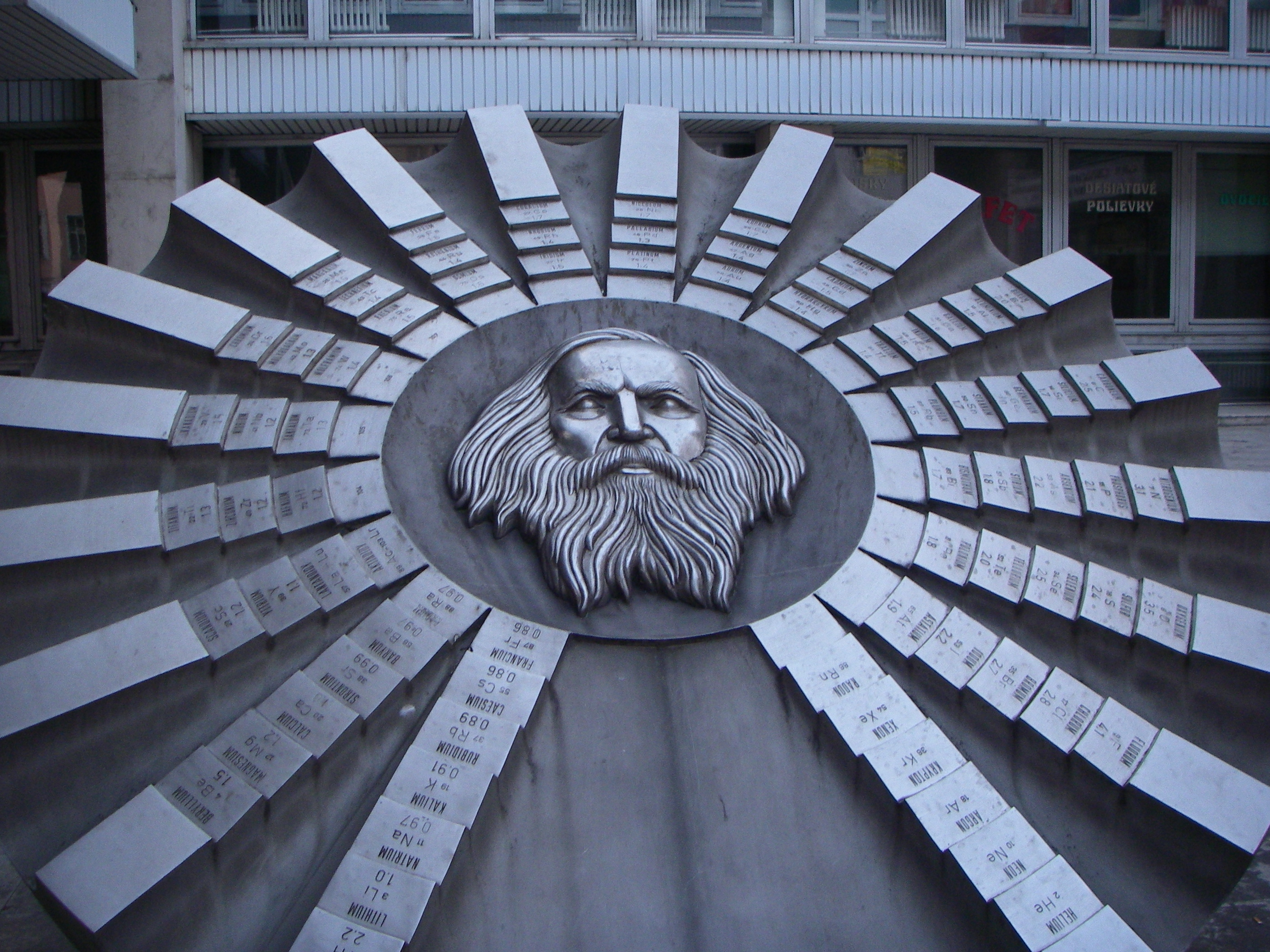
A sculpture in honor of Dmitry Mendeleev and his periodic table in Slovakia

Dmitry Mendeleev invented the periodic table, that is the main framework of the modern chemistry, while Aleksandr Butlerov was one of the creators of the theory of chemical structure, playing a central role in organic chemistry. Vladimir Shukhov invented the first cracking method. Sergei Lebedev invented the first commercially viable and mass-produced type of synthetic rubber (polybutadiene synthetic rubber). Nikolay Semyonov made major contributions to explanation of the mechanism of chemical transformation (1956 Nobel Prize in Chemistry).

=== Biology ===
In biology Dmitry Ivanovsky discovered viruses (1892) and Nikolai Lunin discovered vitamins (1881). Ivan Pavlov is widely known for first describing the phenomenon of classical conditioning and using it for studying brain functions. Ilya Mechnikov was a pioneer in investigations of the immune system (1908, Nobel Prize in Medicine). Alexander A. Maximow introduced the notion of stem cells. Alexander Oparin was a founder of the modern theory of origin of life. Nikolai Koltsov, a founder of molecular biology, proposed the idea of the molecular mechanism of heredity as early as in 1927 stating that inherited traits would be inherited via a "giant hereditary molecule" which would be made up of "two mirror strands that would replicate in a semi-conservative fashion using each strand as a template". Alexey Olovnikov suggested telomere hypothesis of aging which greatly contributed to the theory of aging and later was awarded with Nobel Prize (not shared by Olovnikov).

=== Electrical engineering ===
Nikolay Benardos introduced the arc welding, further developed by Nikolay Slavyanov, Konstantin Khrenov and other Russian engineers. Alexander Lodygin and Pavel Yablochkov were pioneers of electric lighting, and Mikhail Dolivo-Dobrovolsky invented and introduced the first three-phase electric power systems, widely used today. Oleg Losev is often considered as the inventor of the light-emitting diode (LED).

=== Earth sciences ===
Vasily Dokuchaev (1845–1902) is credited with laying the foundations of soil science.

Vladimir Vernadsky (1863–1945) is considered one of the founders of geochemistry, biogeochemistry, and of radiogeology and deeply developed the concepts of biosphere and noosphere.

Mikhail Lomonosov proposed the conservation of mass in chemical reactions, discovered the atmosphere of Venus, and founded modern geology.

=== Performance of Russian students in International Science Olympiads ===
Russia's rank based on number of Gold Medals in last 10 years (2014–2023):

- Physics – 4th
- Chemistry – 2nd
- Biology – 5th
- Mathematics – 4th

== Technology ==
=== Aviation ===
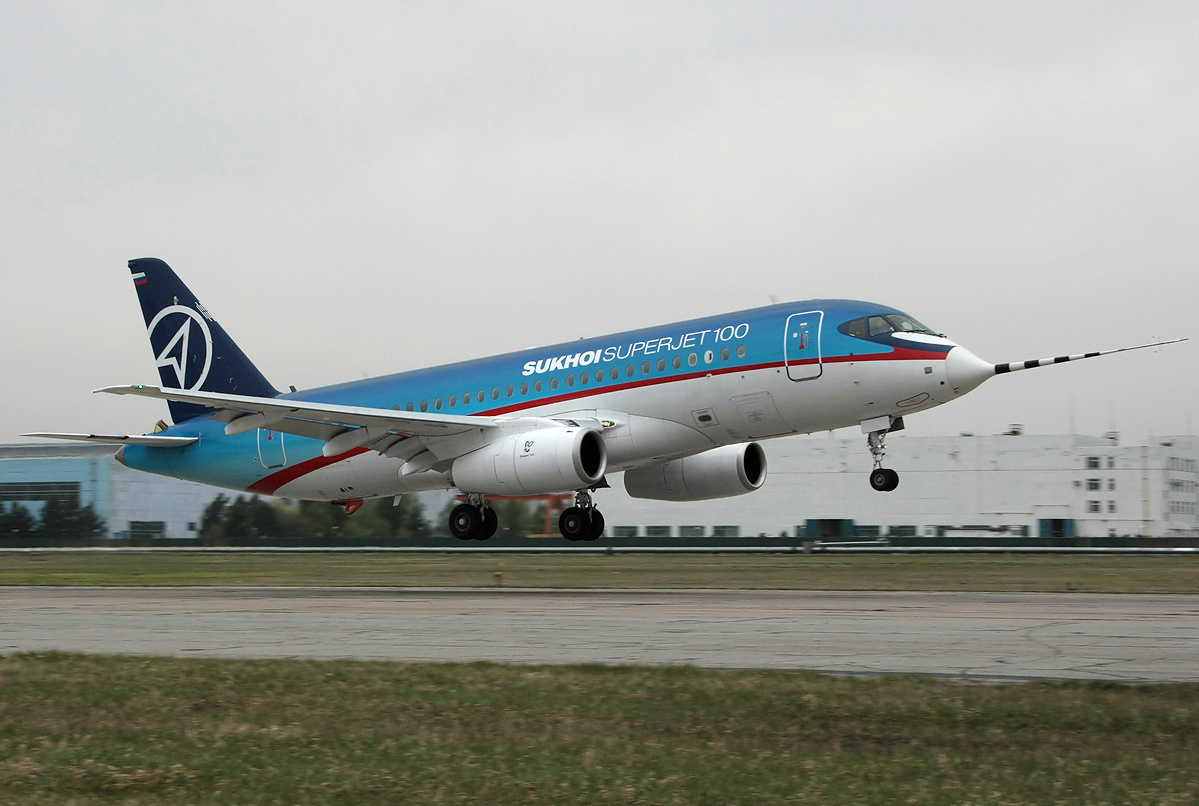
The Sukhoi Superjet 100 is the latest civilian product of the Russian aircraft industry.

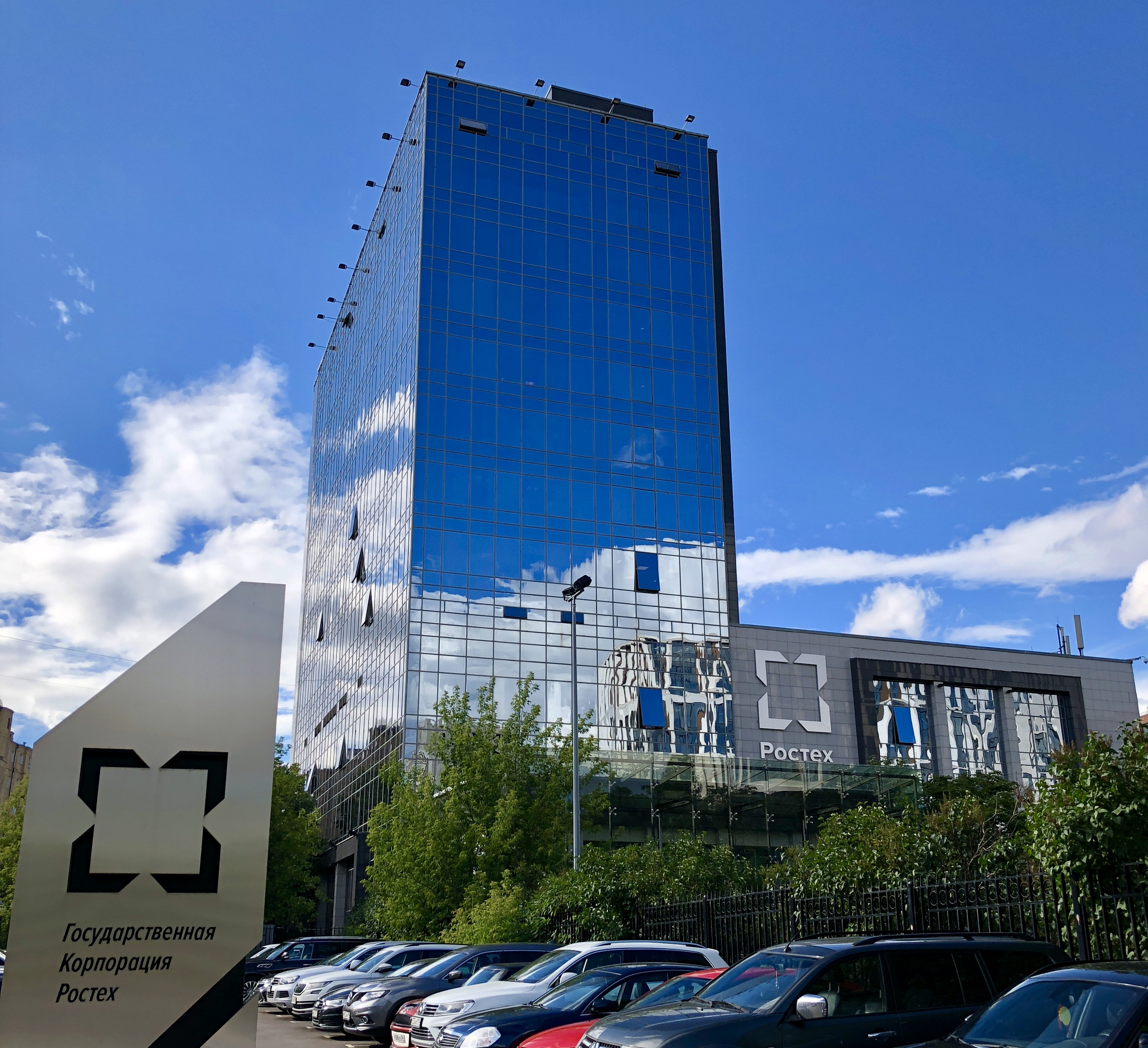
Rostec headquarters in Moscow

The history of Russian aircraft engineering begins with a pioneer of aviation Alexander Mozhaysky who made his first attempt to fly in an aircraft (monoplane) of his own design as early as in 1881. In the 20th century a number of prominent Soviet aerospace engineers, inspired by the fundamental works of Nikolai Zhukovsky and Sergei Chaplygin among others, supervised the creation of many dozens of models of military and civilian aircraft and founded a number of KBs (Construction Bureaus) that now constitute the bulk of Russia's United Aircraft Corporation. A number of individual inventors also made important contributions to aircraft technology, such as Gleb Kotelnikov who invented the knapsack parachute, or Evgeniy Chertovsky who introduced the pressure suit. Theoretical works by Petr Ufimtsev played a critical role in development of stealth technology.

Famous Russian airplanes include the first supersonic passenger jet Tupolev Tu-144 by Alexei Tupolev, MiG fighter aircraft series by Artem Mikoyan and Mikhail Gurevich, and Su series by Pavel Sukhoi and his followers. The MiG-15 is the jet aircraft with the world's highest production in history, while MiG-21 is the most produced supersonic aircraft. Since the World War II era the Ilyushin Il-2 bomber remains the most produced military aircraft in history. The Polikarpov Po-2 Kukuruznik is the world's most produced biplane, and the Mil Mi-8 is the most produced helicopter.

Aircraft manufacturing is one of the most science-intensive high tech sectors of modern Russian economy and employs the largest number of skilled personnel. The production and value of the military aircraft branch far outstrips other defense industry sectors, and aircraft products make up more than half of the country's arms exports. The Russian aircraft industry offers a portfolio of internationally competitive military aircraft, while new projects such as the Sukhoi Superjet 100 are hoped to revive the fortunes of the civilian aircraft segment. In 2009, companies belonging to the United Aircraft Corporation delivered 95 new fixed-wing aircraft to its customers, including 15 civilian models. In addition, the industry produced over 141 helicopters.

=== Space technology ===
Roscosmos is Russia's national space agency; while Russian achievements in the field of space technology and space exploration are traced back to Konstantin Tsiolkovsky, the father of theoretical astronautics. His works had inspired leading Soviet rocket engineers, such as Sergey Korolyov, Valentin Glushko, and many others who contributed to the success of the Soviet space program in the early stages of the Space Race and beyond.

In 1957, the first Earth-orbiting artificial satellite, Sputnik 1, was launched. In 1961, the first human trip into space was successfully made by Yuri Gagarin. Many other Soviet and Russian space exploration records ensued, including the first spacewalk performed by Alexei Leonov. Vostok 6 was the first human spaceflight to carry a woman into space (Valentina Tereshkova). Luna 9 was the first spacecraft to land on the Moon, Sputnik 2 was the first spacecraft to carry an animal (Laika), Zond 5 brought the first Earthlings (two tortoises and other life forms) to circumnavigate the Moon, Venera 7 was the first spacecraft to land on another planet (Venus), and Mars 3 was the first spacecraft to land on Mars. Lunokhod 1 was the first space exploration rover, and Salyut 1 was the world's first space station.

Russia is among the world's largest satellite launchers, and has completed the GLONASS satellite navigation system. It is developing its own fifth-generation jet fighter (Sukhoi Su-57), and has built the world's first floating nuclear power plant. Luna-Glob is a Russian Moon exploration programme, with its first mission scheduled to launch in October 2021 (Luna 25). To replace the ageing Soyuz, Roscosmos is also developing the Orel spacecraft, which could conduct its first crewed fight in 2025. In February 2019, it was announced that Russia is intending to conduct its first crewed mission to land on the Moon in 2031. In April 2021, Roscosmos declared that it is planning to quit the ISS, and will create its own space station with the aim of launching it into orbit by 2030. In June 2021, Roscosmos and China National Space Administration announced that they are jointly developing a lunar base, which is planned to be utilized from 2036.

=== Military ===
Famous Russian battle tanks include the T-34, a well-regarded middle tank design of World War II, and further tanks of the T-series, including the most produced tank in history, the T-54/55, the first fully gas turbine tank T-80, and the most modern Russian tanks T-90 and T-14 Armata. The AK-47 and AK-74 by Mikhail Kalashnikov constitute the most widely used type of assault rifle throughout the world—so much so that more AK-type rifles have been manufactured than all other assault rifles combined. With these and other weapons Russia for a long time has been among the world's top arms suppliers, accounting for around 30% of worldwide weapons sales and exporting weapons to about 80 countries.

The defence industry of Russia is a strategically important sector and a large employer. Russia is the second largest conventional arms exporter after the United States, with $8 billions' worth of exports in 2008. The most popular types of weaponry bought from Russia are Sukhoi and MiG fighters, air defense systems, helicopters, tanks, armored personnel carriers and infantry fighting vehicles. Aviation products make up about half of the country's arms exports. One of the industry's recent technological achievements was the maiden flight of the fifth generation fighter Sukhoi Su-57, which broke the United States' complete monopoly on development and production of fifth generation jets. The Moscow Defense Brief journal hailed the occasion as a major coup for Russia's defence industry, saying that:

{W}hile not America’s equal militarily, Russia is still a solid second in terms of defense technology, outranking both Western Europe and China and punching well above its economic weight.

=== Computing ===
Sergei Lebedev developed one of the first universally programmable computers in continental Europe in 1950, MESM. The first ternary computer Setun was developed by Nikolay Brusentsov, together with Sergei Sobolev in 1958.

=== Automotive industry ===
Niva was one of the first off-road vehicles gaining international success and is still exported to Canada, South America and Europe. KAMAZ trucks are exported to many areas of the world including Eastern Europe, Latin America, China, the Middle East, and North Africa and are persistent winners (ten times) of the famous Dakar Rally.

=== Railroads ===
Ivan Polzunov is credited with creation of the first steam engine in Russia and the first two-cylinder engine in the world.

=== Nuclear ===
The creation of the first nuclear power plant along with the first nuclear reactors for submarines and surface ships was directed by Igor Kurchatov. NS Lenin was the world's first nuclear-powered surface ship as well as the first nuclear-powered civilian vessel, and NS Arktika became the first surface ship to reach the North Pole.

== Science and politics ==
Russian scientists must provide detailed reports to the Kremlin about their contacts to foreign scientists—even if these contacts are of private nature. This requirement includes even Russian scientists who work outside Russia. In addition, Russian scientists must inform the government about their plans to meet foreign scientists at least 5 days in advance.

Russia ranked 59th in the Global Innovation Index in 2024, down from 45th in 2021.

== See also ==
- Bibliography of science and technology in Russia and the Soviet Union
- Science and technology in the Soviet Union
- Timeline of Russian inventions and technology records
- List of Russian inventors
- List of Russian inventions
- List of Russian scientists
- Open access in Russia to scholarly communication
