= Ternac =

TERNAC is an emulation written in FORTRAN of a ternary computer on a binary machine, a Burroughs B1700. It was implemented in 1973 at State University of New York, Buffalo (SUNY Buffalo). The implementation provided both fixed-point and floating-point capability; fixed-point words were 24 trits in length and the floating-point words had 42 trits for mantissa and 6 trits for exponent.

TERNAC was intended primarily to discover if the implementation of a nonbinary structure on a binary computer was feasible, and to ascertain the cost in memory storage and time for such an implementation. As a feasibility test, it was successful, and proved that both speed and price are comparable with that of binary computers.

== See also ==
- Setun (ternary computer constructed in USSR)
