= Lev Gutenmaher =

Soviet mathematician

- Born: 1908; Tarutino, Bessarabia, Russian Empire
- Died: 1981 (aged 72–73); Odessa, Ukraine
- Education: Novocherkassk Polytechnic Institute
- Scientific career
- Fields: Mathematics, Informatics
- Workplaces: National Research Nuclear University, SIE NEFTEHIM

Lev Israilevich Gutenmaher (Russian: Лев Изра́илевич Гутенма́хер) was a Soviet mathematician who conducted pioneering research in the area of computing technologies and made significant contributions to the early development of computer science. He was a recipient of the Stalin and National awards for his work.

== Biography ==
Lev Gutenmaher was born in Tarutino (now Bessarabske), Bessarabia in 1908. He received his master's degree in mathematics from the Don Polytechnic Institute (since renamed as the Novocherkassk Polytechnic Institute) in 1931. He successfully completed his doctorate in 1934 and remained as a professor of mathematics at the institute until 1938.

In 1939, Gutenmaher moved to Moscow. He was tapped to head the laboratory for electronic modeling (LEM) at the Energetics Institute of the Russian Academy of Sciences. Alongside his work at the laboratory, he taught courses as a professor at the National Research Nuclear University.

Gutenmaher began his pioneering work on the usage of electronic networks to model complex informational systems and solve equations in the late 1930s. In the mid-1940s, he oversaw the development of the first analog computing machines. In 1950, he spearheaded the creation of an electronic computing machine that used contactless electromagnetic relays running on ferrite-diode cells. In 1954, he presented the first LEM-1 machine and in 1956, he published a scientific paper on the successful usage of matrix storage for data retention.

Gutenmaher was one of the earliest computer scientists in the Soviet Union. He pioneered the usage of computers to model cognitive and linguistic processes. His research papers covered such topics as data storage and retrieval, software development, and computerized telephony. A number of his works were translated into English, German, French, and Spanish.

He died in Odessa in 1981, where he had returned to in his sunset years to teach at the Odessa Polytechnic Institute.

== Works ==
- Electronic modeling: Electrointegrator. Soviet Academy of Sciences: Moscow-Leningrad, 1943.
- Electronic models and their use in engineering and physics. Lecture notes. Pravda: Moscow, 1946.
- Electronic models. Soviet Academy of Sciences: Moscow, 1949.
- Electronic information-logic machines. Soviet Academy of Sciences: Moscow, 1960 and 1962.
- Traitement électronique de l’information. A. Deweze, Traducteur. Société des Editions Radio: Paris, 1961.
- Electronic information-logic machines. Wiley Interscience: Нью-Йорк, 1963.
- Tratamiento electrónico de la información. Editorial: Paraninfo: Madrid and Mexico, 1964.
- Thinking machines. Translated from the Russian by A. Zdornykh. Foreign Languages Publishing House: Moscow, 1965.
- Informations-Logische Automaten. Automatisierung im Informations-und Bibliothekswesen. R. Oldenbourg Verlag: Munich and Vienna, 1966.
- Associative memory devices. Energy: Leningrad, 1967.
- Electronic models. Tehnika: Kiev, 1975.
