= Generalized balanced ternary =

Generalized balanced ternary is a generalization of the balanced ternary numeral system to represent points in a higher-dimensional space. It was first described in 1982 by Laurie Gibson and Dean Lucas. It has since been used for various applications, including geospatial and high-performance scientific computing.

== General form ==
Like standard positional numeral systems, generalized balanced ternary represents a point $p$ as powers of a base $B$ multiplied by digits $d_i$.

$$p = d_0 + B d_1 + B^2 d_2 + \ldots$$

Generalized balanced ternary uses a transformation matrix as its base $B$. Digits are vectors chosen from a finite subset $\{D_0 = 0, D_1, \ldots, D_n\}$ of the underlying space.

== One dimension ==
In one dimension, generalized balanced ternary is equivalent to standard balanced ternary, with three digits (0, 1, and −1). $B$ is a $1\times 1$ matrix, and the digits $D_i$ are length-1 vectors, so they appear here without the extra brackets.

$$\begin{align}B &= 3 \\ D_0 &= 0 \\ D_1 &= 1 \\ D_2 &= -1\end{align}$$

=== Addition table ===
This is the same addition table as standard balanced ternary, but with $D_2$ replacing T. To make the table easier to read, the numeral $i$ is written instead of $D_i$.

Addition
+	0	1	2
0	0	1	2
1	1	12	0
2	2	0	21

== Two dimensions ==
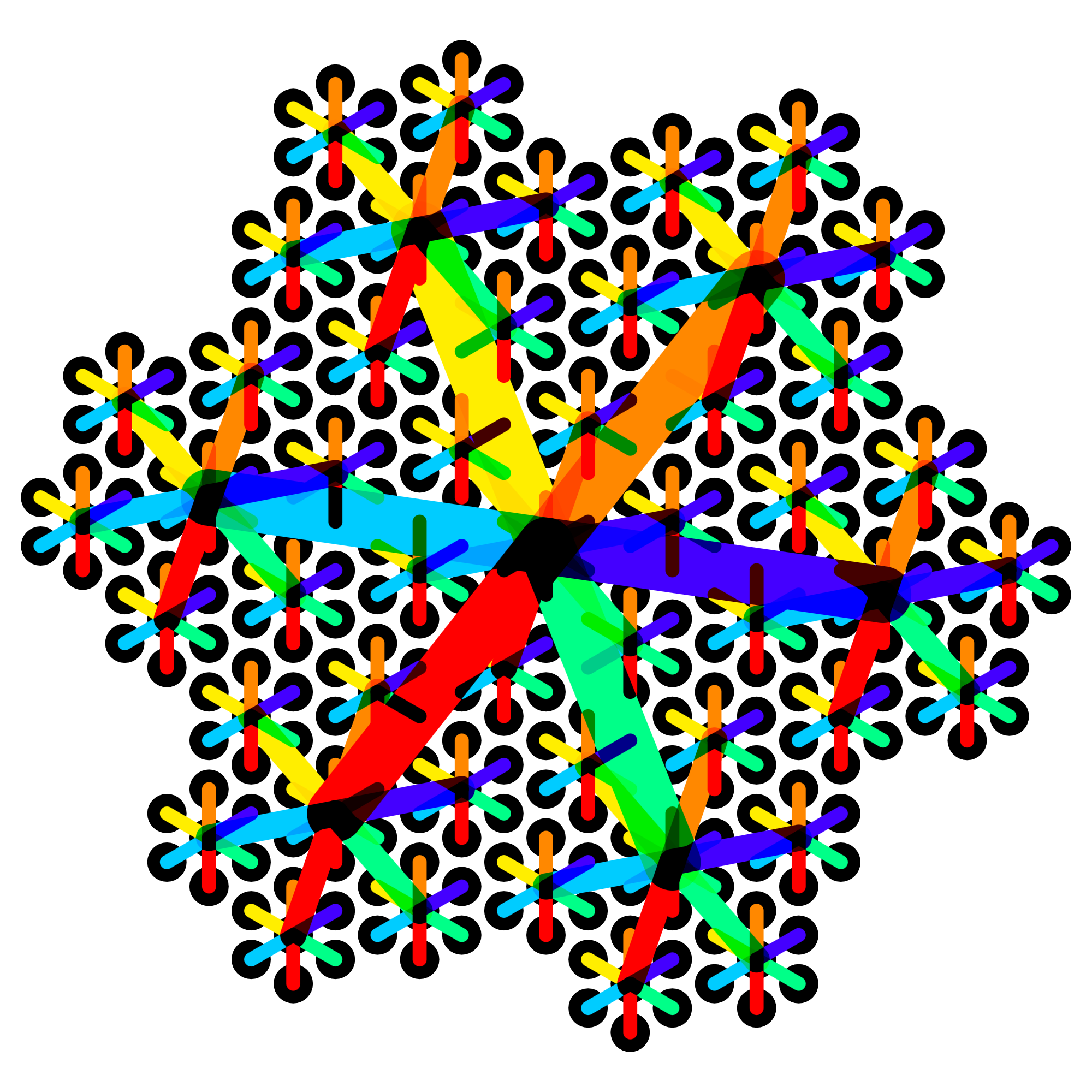
The 2D points addressable by three generalized balanced ternary digits. Each point is addressed by its path from the origin; the six colors correspond to the six non-zero digits.

In two dimensions, there are seven digits. The digits $D_1, \ldots, D_6$ are six points arranged in a regular hexagon centered at $D_0 = 0$.

$$\begin{align}
B &= \frac{1}{2}\begin{bmatrix} 5 & \sqrt{3} \\ -\sqrt{3} & 5 \end{bmatrix} \\
D_0 &= 0 \\
D_1 &= \left( 0, \sqrt{3} \right) \\
D_2 &= \left( \frac{3}{2}, -\frac{\sqrt{3}}{2} \right) \\
D_3 &= \left( \frac{3}{2}, \frac{\sqrt{3}}{2} \right) \\
D_4 &= \left( -\frac{3}{2}, -\frac{\sqrt{3}}{2} \right) \\
D_5 &= \left( -\frac{3}{2}, \frac{\sqrt{3}}{2} \right) \\
D_6 &= \left( 0, -\sqrt{3} \right) \\
\end{align}$$

=== Addition table ===
As in the one-dimensional addition table, the numeral $i$ is written instead of $D_i$ (despite e.g. $D_2$ having no particular relationship to the number 2).

Addition
+	0	1	2	3	4	5	6
0	0	1	2	3	4	5	6
1	1	12	3	34	5	16	0
2	2	3	24	25	6	0	61
3	3	34	25	36	0	1	2
4	4	5	6	0	41	52	43
5	5	16	0	1	52	53	4
6	6	0	61	2	43	4	65

If there are two numerals in a cell, the left one is carried over to the next digit. Unlike standard addition, addition of two-dimensional generalized balanced ternary numbers may require multiple carries to be performed while computing a single digit.

== See also ==
- Gosper curve
