= SIE Neftehim =

Joint stock company based in Russia

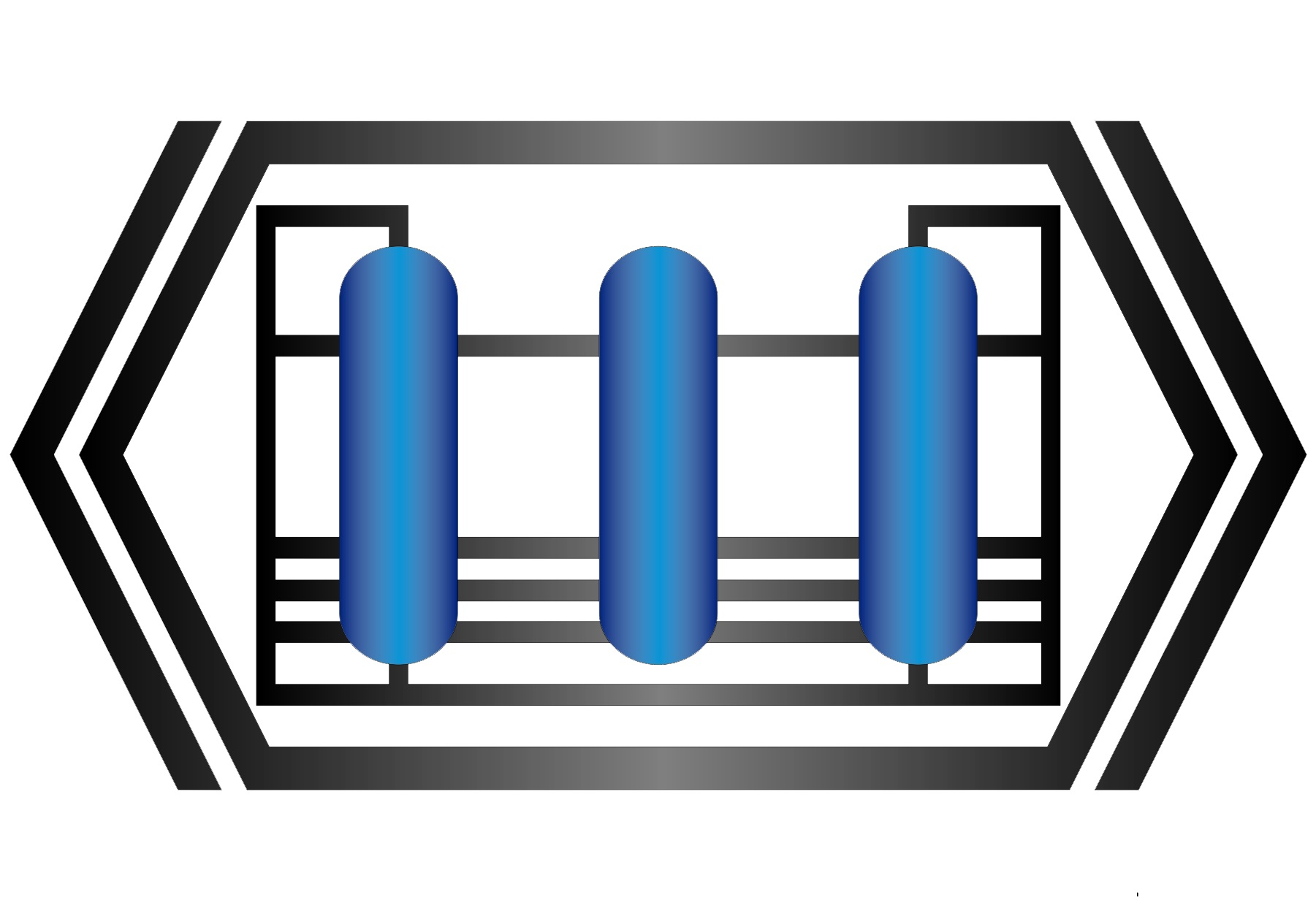
- Industry: Engineering
- Founded: 1948
- Headquarters: Krasnodar, Russian Federation
- Key people: Alexander Shakun (CEO and President)
- Products: Catalysts; Adsorbents; Process technology
- Website: www.nefthim.com

SIE Neftehim (Note: "SIE" is Scientific Industrial Enterprise. "Neftehim" is a compound of Russian words meaning "oil" and "chemistry".) (Russian: НПП Нефтехим) is a Russian joint stock company based in Krasnodar, undertaking research and development in the petrochemical industry. Its origins lie in the research laboratory attached to Krasnodar Refinery, which first developed the use of aluminium-platinum catalysts in the Soviet Union. Established in its present form in 1996, the company continues to develop catalytic techniques, isomerization processes, and other petroleum refining technologies.

== History ==
Creation and establishing of the scientific and research enterprise on development and introduction of petrochemical processes in Krasnodar is closely related to solving the issue of introduction of catalytic reforming process for gasoline fractions in Russian oil refining industry. The main step was construction of catalytic reforming semi-production unit, which allowed testing this process and submitting the necessary data for designing and construction of large scale commercial units. Besides, all new reforming catalysts were tested at the unit beginning with AP-56 (АП-56) and out to KR (КР) catalysts. Since the 1950s, the enterprise has been repeatedly reorganized and renamed:

- 35th (research) workshop of Krasnodar Refinery, 1948-1958
- Petrochemical department of Krasnodar VNIIneft (All-Soviet Union Scientific and Research Oil Institute), 1959–1964
- Krasnodar branch of VNIINeftekhim (All-Soviet Union Scientific and Research Petrochemical Institute), 1964–1992
- Krasnodar branch of Leningrad Scientific and Research Association “Lenneftekhim”, 1992
- Subsidiary Joint Stock Company “Neftekhim”, 1995–1997
- JSC SIE Neftehim since, April 16, 1997,

The modern image, as well as research and activity trends of the enterprise started to form after its corporatization in 1995–1996. The enterprise underwent some structural changes, inefficient researches were reduced and the main efforts were focused on the major trends, i.e. reforming and isomerization of gasoline fractions. The company searches for and develops technologies and catalysts for Russian and foreign refineries. The enterprise is operated in accordance with the ISO 9001:2008 quality management system in the sphere of development and introduction of petrochemical processes.

== Company management ==
JSC SIE Neftehim is directed by its major shareholders – Shakun Alexander Nikitovich (General Director) and Fedorova Marina Leonidovna (Technical Director).

== Structure of the enterprise ==
- Catalysts Synthesis Department – development and improvement of the catalysts composition;
- Catalysts Testing Department – twenty-four-hour studying of catalysts samples at five bench-scale units that allow simulating hydrotreatment, reforming, isomerization and sharp rectification processes;
- Department of Physical and Chemical Testing Methods – a modern laboratory fitted out with up-to-date equipment for catalysts, adsorbents, gasoline fractions and gases analysis in compliance with GOST, ASTM, UOP, ISO and self-developed certified methods;
- Department of Process Automation and Instrumentation – integrated work on the process automation and instrumentation within the enterprise;
- Engineering Department of JSC SIE Neftehim – designing, monitoring, and developing of instructions for isomerization and reforming units;
- Patents and Licensing Department – performing patent research and FTO search for inventions of JSC SIE Neftehim, as well as filing patent applications in Russia and abroad.

== Resources ==
- Specialized equipment for scientific activity;
- pilot plants for isomerization and reforming catalysts testing;
- specialized software, including proprietary developments and methods for detailed process calculations, as well as for certain equipment;
- participation in the running processes at production facilities.

== Activity ==
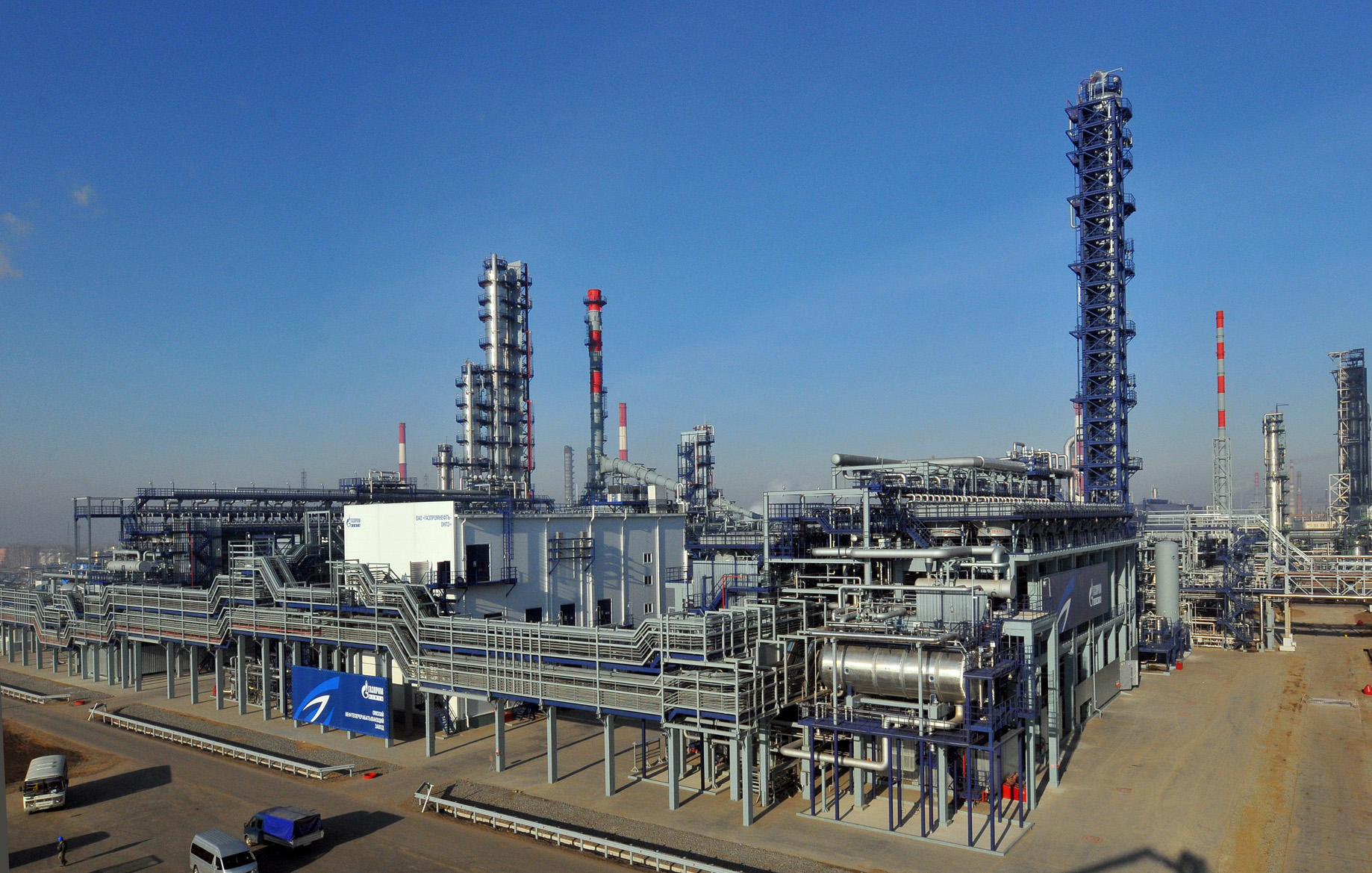
Isomalk-2 Isomerization Unit, JSC Gazpromneft-ONPZ, Omsk.

At the present time activity of the enterprise is focused on development of Design Basis or Basic Engineering Design for detailed engineering of isomerization (technology Isomalk-2, isomerization n-butane Isomalk-3, isomerization n-heptane Isomalk-4) and reforming units, as well as on isomerization and reforming catalysts supply, monitoring of isomerization and reforming units operation, analytical research of hydrocarbon fractions and catalysts, creation of new catalysts.

== See also ==
- Catalytic reforming
- Isomerization
- Omsk Refinery
- Ufa Refinery
- Yaroslavl Refinery
