= Balanced ternary =

Numeral system using the values -1, 0 and 1

Balanced ternary is a ternary numeral system (i.e. base 3 with three digits) that uses a balanced signed-digit representation of the integers in which the digits have the values −1, 0, and 1. This stands in contrast to the standard (unbalanced) ternary system, in which digits have values 0, 1 and 2. The balanced ternary system can represent all integers without using a separate minus sign; the value of the leading non-zero digit of a number has the sign of the number itself. The balanced ternary system is an example of a non-standard positional numeral system. It was used in some early computers and has also been used to solve balance puzzles.

Different sources use different glyphs to represent the three digits in balanced ternary. In this article, T (which resembles a ligature of the minus sign and 1) represents −1, while 0 and 1 represent themselves. Other conventions include using '−' and '+' to represent −1 and 1 respectively, or using Greek letter theta (Θ), which resembles a minus sign in a circle, to represent −1. In publications about the Setun computer, −1 is represented as overturned 1: "1".

Balanced ternary makes an early appearance in Michael Stifel's book Arithmetica Integra (1544). It also occurs in the works of Johannes Kepler and Léon Lalanne. Related signed-digit schemes in other bases have been discussed by John Colson, John Leslie, Augustin-Louis Cauchy, and possibly even the ancient Indian Vedas.

== Definition ==
Let $\mathcal{D}_{3} := \lbrace \operatorname{T}, 0, 1 \rbrace$ denote the set of symbols (also called glyphs or characters), where the symbol $\bar{1}$ is sometimes used in place of $\operatorname{T}.$ Define an integer-valued function $f = f_{\mathcal{D}_{3}} : \mathcal{D}_{3} \to \mathbb{Z}$ by

$$\begin{align}
f_{}(\operatorname{T}) &= -1, \\
f_{}(0) &= 0, \\
f_{}(1) &= 1,
\end{align}$$

where the right hand sides are integers with their usual values. This function, $f_{},$ is what rigorously and formally establishes how integer values are assigned to the symbols/glyphs in $\mathcal{D}_{3}.$ One benefit of this formalism is that the definition of "the integers" (however they may be defined) is not conflated with any particular system for writing/representing them; in this way, these two distinct (albeit closely related) concepts are kept separate.

The set $\mathcal{D}_{3}$ together with the function $f_{}$ forms a balanced signed-digit representation called the balanced ternary system. It can be used to represent integers and real numbers.

=== Ternary integer evaluation ===
Let $\mathcal{D}_{3}^{+}$ be the Kleene plus of $\mathcal{D}_{3}$, which is the set of all finite length concatenated strings $d_n \ldots d_0$ of one or more symbols (called its digits) where $n$ is a non-negative integer and all $n + 1$ digits $d_n, \ldots, d_0$ are taken from $\mathcal{D}_{3} = \lbrace \operatorname{T}, 0, 1 \rbrace.$ The start of $d_n \ldots d_0$ is the symbol $d_0$ (at the right), its end is $d_n$ (at the left), and its length is $n + 1$. The ternary evaluation is the function $v = v_{3} ~:~ \mathcal{D}_{3}^{+} \to \mathbb{Z}$ defined by assigning to every string $d_n \ldots d_0 \in \mathcal{D}_{3}^{+}$ the integer

$$v\left( d_n \ldots d_0 \right) ~=~ \sum_{i=0}^{n} f_{} \left( d_{i} \right) 3^{i}.$$

The string $d_n \ldots d_0$ represents (with respect to $v$) the integer $v\left( d_n \ldots d_0 \right).$ The value $v\left( d_n \ldots d_0 \right)$ may alternatively be denoted by ${d_n \ldots d_0}_{\operatorname{bal}3}.$ The map $v : \mathcal{D}_{3}^{+} \to \mathbb{Z}$ is surjective but not injective since, for example, $0 = v(0) = v(00) = v(0 0 0) = \cdots.$ However, every nonzero integer has exactly one representation under $v$ that does not end (on the left) with the symbol $0,$ i.e. $d_n = 0 .$

If $d_n \ldots d_0 \in \mathcal{D}_{3}^{+}$ and $n > 0$ then $v$ satisfies:

$$v\left( d_n d_{n-1} \ldots d_0 \right) ~=~  f_{} \left( d_{n} \right) 3^{n} + v\left( d_{n-1} \ldots d_0 \right)$$

which shows that $v$ satisfies a sort of recurrence relation. This recurrence relation has the initial condition $v\left( \varepsilon \right) = 0$ where $\varepsilon$ is the empty string.

This implies that for every string $d_n \ldots d_0 \in \mathcal{D}_{3}^{+},$

$$v\left( 0 d_n \ldots d_0 \right) = v\left( d_n \ldots d_0 \right)$$

which in words says that leading $0$ symbols (to the left in a string with 2 or more symbols) do not affect the resulting value.

The following examples illustrate how some values of $v$ can be computed, where (as before) all integer are written in decimal (base 10) and all elements of $\mathcal{D}_{3}^{+}$ are just symbols.

$$\begin{alignat}{10}
v\left( \operatorname{T} \operatorname{T} \right)
&= && f_{}\left( \operatorname{T} \right) 3^{1} + && f_{}\left( \operatorname{T} \right) 3^{0}
&&= &&(-1) &&3 &&\,+\, &&(-1) &&1
&&= -4 \\
v\left( \operatorname{T} 1 \right)
&= && f_{}\left( \operatorname{T} \right) 3^{1} + && f_{}\left( 1 \right) 3^{0}
&&= &&(-1) &&3 &&\,+\, &&(1) &&1
&&= -2 \\
v\left( 1 \operatorname{T} \right)
&= && f_{}\left( 1 \right) 3^{1} + && f_{}\left( \operatorname{T} \right) 3^{0}
&&= &&(1) &&3 &&\,+\, &&(-1) &&1
&&= 2 \\
v\left( 1 1 \right)
&= && f_{}\left( 1 \right) 3^{1} + && f_{}\left( 1 \right) 3^{0}
&&= &&(1) &&3 &&\,+\, &&(1) &&1
&&= 4 \\
v\left( 1 \operatorname{T} 0 \right)
&= f_{}\left( 1 \right) 3^{2} + && f_{}\left( \operatorname{T} \right) 3^{1} + && f_{}\left( 0 \right) 3^{0}
&&= (1) 9 \,+\, &&(-1) &&3 &&\,+\, &&(0) &&1
&&= 6 \\
v\left( 1 0 \operatorname{T} \right)
&= f_{}\left( 1 \right) 3^{2} + && f_{}\left( 0 \right) 3^{1} + && f_{}\left( \operatorname{T} \right) 3^{0}
&&= (1) 9 \,+\, &&(0) &&3 &&\,+\, &&(-1) &&1
&&= 8 \\
\end{alignat}$$

and using the above recurrence relation

$$v\left( 1 0 1 \operatorname{T} \right) = f_{}\left( 1 \right) 3^{3} + v\left( 0 1 \operatorname{T} \right) = (1) 27 + v\left( 1 \operatorname{T} \right) = 27 + 2 = 29.$$

== Conversions to/from other representations ==
=== Conversion to decimal ===
In the balanced ternary system the value of a digit n places left of the radix point is the product of the digit and 3^{n}. This is useful when converting between decimal and balanced ternary. In the following the strings denoting balanced ternary carry the suffix, bal3. For instance,

10_{bal3} = 1 × 3^{1} + 0 × 3^{0} = 3_{dec}
10𝖳_{bal3} = 1 × 3^{2} + 0 × 3^{1} + (−1) × 3^{0} = 8_{dec}
−9_{dec} = −1 × 3^{2} + 0 × 3^{1} + 0 × 3^{0} = 𝖳00_{bal3}
8_{dec} = 1 × 3^{2} + 0 × 3^{1} + (−1) × 3^{0} = 10𝖳_{bal3}

Similarly, the first place to the right of the radix point holds 3^{−1} = 1/3, the second place holds 3^{−2} = 1/9, and so on. For instance,

−2/3_{dec} = −1 + 1/3 = −1 × 3^{0} + 1 × 3^{−1} = 𝖳.1_{bal3}.

Dec	Bal3	Expansion
0	0	0
1	1	+1
2	1𝖳	+3−1
3	10	+3
4	11	+3+1
5	1𝖳𝖳	+9−3−1
6	1𝖳0	+9−3
7	1𝖳1	+9−3+1
8	10𝖳	+9−1
9	100	+9
10	101	+9+1
11	11𝖳	+9+3−1
12	110	+9+3
13	111	+9+3+1

Dec	Bal3	Expansion
0	0	0
−1	𝖳	−1
−2	𝖳1	−3+1
−3	𝖳0	−3
−4	𝖳𝖳	−3−1
−5	𝖳11	−9+3+1
−6	𝖳10	−9+3
−7	𝖳1𝖳	−9+3−1
−8	𝖳01	−9+1
−9	𝖳00	−9
−10	𝖳0𝖳	−9−1
−11	𝖳𝖳1	−9−3+1
−12	𝖳𝖳0	−9−3
−13	𝖳𝖳𝖳	−9−3−1

An integer is divisible by three if and only if the digit in the units place is zero.

The parity of a balanced ternary integer may be checked by checking the parity of the sum of all trits. This sum has the same parity as the integer itself.

Balanced ternary can also be extended to fractional numbers similar to how decimal numbers are written to the right of the radix point.

Decimal	−0.9	−0.8	−0.7	−0.6	−0.5	−0.4	−0.3	−0.2	−0.1	0
Balanced Ternary	𝖳.0̅1̅0̅𝖳̅	𝖳.1̅𝖳̅𝖳̅1̅	𝖳.1̅0̅𝖳̅0̅	𝖳.1̅1̅𝖳̅𝖳̅	0.𝖳̅ or 𝖳.1̅	0.𝖳̅𝖳̅1̅1̅	0.𝖳̅0̅1̅0̅	0.𝖳̅1̅1̅𝖳̅	0.0̅𝖳̅0̅1̅	0
Decimal	0.9	0.8	0.7	0.6	0.5	0.4	0.3	0.2	0.1	0
Balanced Ternary	1.0̅𝖳̅0̅1̅	1.𝖳̅1̅1̅𝖳̅	1.𝖳̅0̅1̅0̅	1.𝖳̅𝖳̅1̅1̅	0.1̅ or 1.𝖳̅	0.1̅1̅𝖳̅𝖳̅	0.1̅0̅𝖳̅0̅	0.1̅𝖳̅𝖳̅1̅	0.0̅1̅0̅𝖳̅	0

In decimal or binary, integer values and terminating fractions have multiple representations. For example, 1/10 = 0.1 = 0.10̅ = 0.09̅. And, 1/2 = 0.1_{2} = 0.10̅_{2} = 0.01̅_{2}. Some balanced ternary fractions have multiple representations too. For example, 1/6 = 0.1𝖳̅_{bal3} = 0.01̅_{bal3}. In decimal and binary, the rightmost trailing infinite 0s after the radix point may be omitted to gain a representations of integer or terminating fraction; but in balanced ternary, the rightmost trailing infinite −1s after the radix point cannot be omitted in order to gain a representations of integer or terminating fraction.

Donald Knuth has pointed out that truncation and rounding are the same operation in balanced ternary—they produce exactly the same result (a property shared with other balanced numeral systems). The number 1/2 is not exceptional; it has two equally valid representations, and two equally valid truncations: 0.1̅ (round to 0, and truncate to 0) and 1.𝖳̅ (round to 1, and truncate to 1). With an odd radix, double rounding is also equivalent to directly rounding to the final precision, unlike with an even radix.

The basic operations—addition, subtraction, multiplication, and division—are done as in regular ternary. Multiplication by two can be done by adding a number to itself, or subtracting itself after a-trit-left-shifting.

An arithmetic shift left of a balanced ternary number is the equivalent of multiplication by a (positive, integral) power of 3; and an arithmetic shift right of a balanced ternary number is the equivalent of division by a (positive, integral) power of 3.

=== Conversion to and from a fraction ===
Fraction	Balanced ternary	
1	1	
1/2	0.1̅	1.𝖳̅
1/3	0.1	
1/4	0.1̅𝖳̅	
1/5	0.1̅𝖳̅𝖳̅1̅	
1/6	0.01̅	0.1𝖳̅
1/7	0.0̅1̅1̅0̅𝖳̅𝖳̅	
1/8	0.0̅1̅	
1/9	0.01	
1/10	0.0̅1̅0̅𝖳̅	

Fraction	Balanced ternary	
1/11	0.0̅1̅𝖳̅1̅1̅	
1/12	0.01̅𝖳̅	
1/13	0.0̅1̅𝖳̅	
1/14	0.0̅1̅𝖳̅0̅𝖳̅1̅	
1/15	0.01̅𝖳̅𝖳̅1̅	
1/16	0.0̅1̅𝖳̅𝖳̅	
1/17	0.0̅1̅𝖳̅𝖳̅𝖳̅1̅0̅𝖳̅0̅𝖳̅1̅1̅1̅𝖳̅0̅1̅	
1/18	0.001̅	0.01𝖳̅
1/19	0.0̅0̅1̅1̅1̅𝖳̅1̅0̅1̅0̅0̅𝖳̅𝖳̅𝖳̅1̅𝖳̅0̅𝖳̅	
1/20	0.0̅0̅1̅1̅	

The conversion of a repeating balanced ternary number to a fraction is analogous to converting a repeating decimal. For example (because of 111111_{bal3} = ((3^{6} − 1)/(3 − 1))_{dec}):

$$0.1\overline{\mathrm{110TT0} } =\tfrac{\mathrm{1110TT0-1} }{\mathrm{111111\times 1T\times 10}}=\tfrac{\mathrm{1110TTT} } {\mathrm{111111\times 1T0}}  =\tfrac{\mathrm{111\times 1000T} } {\mathrm{111\times 1001\times 1T0}} =\tfrac{\mathrm{1111\times 1T}}{\mathrm{1001\times 1T0}} =\tfrac{1111}{10010}=\tfrac{\mathrm{1T1T}}{\mathrm{1TTT0}} =\tfrac{101}{\mathrm{1T10} }$$

=== Conversion from unbalanced ternary ===
Unbalanced ternary can be converted to balanced ternary notation in two ways:

- Add 1 trit-by-trit from the first non-zero trit with carry, and then subtract 1 trit-by-trit from the same trit without borrow. For example,
  021_{3} + 11_{3} = 102_{3}, 102_{3} − 11_{3} = 1T1_{bal3} = 7_{dec}.
- If a 2 is present in ternary, turn it into 1T. For example,
  0212_{3} = 0010_{bal3} + 1T00_{bal3} + 001T_{bal3} = 10TT_{bal3} = 23_{dec}

Balanced	Logic	Unsigned
1	True	2
0	Unknown	1
T	False	0

If the three values of ternary logic are false, unknown and true, and these are mapped to balanced ternary as T, 0 and 1 and to conventional unsigned ternary values as 0, 1 and 2, then balanced ternary can be viewed as a biased number system analogous to the offset binary system. If the ternary number has n trits, then the bias b is

$$b=\left\lfloor \frac{3^n}{2} \right\rfloor$$

which is represented as all ones in either conventional or biased form.

As a result, if these two representations are used for balanced and unsigned ternary numbers, an unsigned n-trit positive ternary value can be converted to balanced form by adding the bias b and a positive balanced number can be converted to unsigned form by subtracting the bias b. Furthermore, if x and y are balanced numbers, their balanced sum is x + y − b when computed using conventional unsigned ternary arithmetic. Similarly, if x and y are conventional unsigned ternary numbers, their sum is x + y + b when computed using balanced ternary arithmetic.

=== Conversion from any integer base to balanced ternary ===
Conversion to balanced ternary can be done with the following formula:

$$\left(a_na_{n-1}\cdots a_1a_0.c_1 c_2 c_3\cdots\right)_b =
\sum_{k=0}^n a_kb^k + \sum_{k=1}^\infty c_kb^{-k}.$$

where,

a_{n}a_{n−1}...a_{1}a_{0}.c_{1}c_{2}c_{3}... is the original representation in the original numeral system.
b is the original radix. b is 10 if converting from decimal.
a_{k} and c_{k} are the digits k places to the left and right of the radix point respectively.

For instance,

 −25.4dec = −(1T×1011 + 1TT×1010 + 11×101−1)
          = −(1T×1011 + 1TT×1010 + 11×101T)

          = −(1T×101 + 1TT + 11×0.010T)

          = −(1T1T + 1TT + 0.11TT)

          = −10T1.11TT

          =  T01T.TT11

 1010.12 = 1T10 + 1T1 + 1T−1
         = 1T10 + 1T1 + 1TT

         = 10T + 1T + 0.1

         = 101.1

== Addition, subtraction and multiplication and division ==
The single-trit addition, subtraction, multiplication and division tables are shown below. For subtraction and division, which are not commutative, the first operand is given to the left of the table, while the second is given at the top. For instance, the answer to 1 − T = 1T is found in the bottom left corner of the subtraction table.

Addition
+	T	0	1
T	T1	T	0
0	T	0	1
1	0	1	1T

Subtraction
−	T	0	1
T	0	T	T1
0	1	0	T
1	1T	1	0

Multiplication
×	T	0	1
T	1	0	T
0	0	0	0
1	T	0	1

Division
÷	T	1
T	1	T
0	0	0
1	T	1

=== Multi-trit addition and subtraction ===
Multi-trit addition and subtraction is analogous to that of binary and decimal. Add and subtract trit by trit, and add the carry appropriately. For example:

           1TT1TT.1TT1              1TT1TT.1TT1            1TT1TT.1TT1          1TT1TT.1TT1
         +   11T1.T                −  11T1.T              −  11T1.T     →     +   TT1T.1
        ______________          ______________                               _______________
           1T0T10.0TT1              1T1001.TTT1                                 1T1001.TTT1
         +   1T                   +  T  T1                                    +  T  T1
         ______________         ________________                             ________________
           1T1110.0TT1              1110TT.TTT1                                 1110TT.TTT1
         +   T                    + T   1                                     + T   1
         ______________         ________________                             ________________
           1T0110.0TT1               1100T.TTT1                                  1100T.TTT1

=== Multi-trit multiplication ===
Multi-trit multiplication is analogous to that of binary and decimal.

       1TT1.TT
   ×   T11T.1
   _____________
        1TT.1TT multiply 1
       T11T.11  multiply T
      1TT1T.T   multiply 1
     1TT1TT     multiply 1
    T11T11      multiply T
   _____________
    0T0000T.10T

=== Multi-trit division ===
Balanced ternary division is analogous to that of binary and decimal.

However, 0.5_{dec} = 0.1111..._{bal3} or 1.TTTT..._{bal3}. If the dividend is over the plus or minus half divisor, the trit of the quotient must be 1 or T. If the dividend is between the plus and minus of half the divisor, the trit of the quotient is 0. The magnitude of the dividend must be compared with that of half the divisor before setting the quotient trit. For example,

                         1TT1.TT      quotient
0.5 × divisor  T01.0 _____________                
      divisor T11T.1 ) T0000T.10T     dividend             
                      T11T1                        T000 < T010, set 1
                     _______
                       1T1T0
                       1TT1T                      1T1T0 > 10T0, set T 
                      _______
                         111T
                        1TT1T                      111T > 10T0, set T
                       _______
                          T00.1
                         T11T.1                    T001 < T010, set 1
                        ________
                          1T1.00
                          1TT.1T                  1T100 > 10T0, set T
                         ________
                           1T.T1T
                           1T.T1T                 1TT1T > 10T0, set T
                          ________
                                0

Another example,

                           1TTT
       0.5 × divisor 1T  _______
            Divisor  11  )1T01T                   1T = 1T, but 1T.01 > 1T, set 1
                          11
                         _____
                          T10                    T10 < T1, set T
                           TT
                         ______
                           T11                   T11 < T1, set T
                            TT
                          ______
                             TT                   TT < T1, set T
                             TT
                            ____
                              0

Another example,

                           101.TTTTTTTTT... 
                        or 100.111111111... 
       0.5 × divisor 1T  _________________
            divisor  11  )111T                    11 > 1T, set 1
                          11
                         _____
                            1                     T1 < 1 < 1T, set 0
                           ___
                            1T                    1T = 1T, trits end, set 1.TTTTTTTTT... or 0.111111111...

In balanced ternary, there is a simpler division method that does not require comparing the remainders and operates directly according to the rules. This method originated from Donald Knuth trial quotient method, but this method is not perfect. Later, it was improved by other scholars, completely abandoning the judgment of semi-closed intervals and instead using the condition of whether the highest bit of the remainder of each round of division is 0 to determine whether the round of division is over, and named it the double trial quotient method: the core logic is to split the dividend into two vectors (p and s), where the number of digits of p is at most the same as the divisor q, and s is the vector of the remaining digits; then according to the rule (double positive or double negative gives a positive quotient, one positive and one negative gives a negative quotient, and the others are 0), the quotient is subtracted at most once or twice in each round of division. If the highest bit of the remainder p is still not 0 after subtraction once, it needs to be subtracted again. If the highest bit of the remainder p is 0, the round of division is over, and the bit is the double quotient. The value is doubled and the result is given to register r; then the remainder p Shift left one bit, discard the highest bit of the previous round's divisor (already 0), pull one bit of s to supplement it, and get the new remainder p to carry on to the next round. The result r (3 times magnified) is shifted right one bit and supplemented with 0. Then, when s is exhausted, the result r and the dividend p constitute the final quotient and remainder.

                                                                  +
                      ++0-                                       ++
                     _____________                              _______ 
                +0-  )+0++0+                                 +- )+0+    
                      -0+                                        -+ 
                     ____________                               ______
                      0+-+                                       0++
                       -0+                                        -+
                     ____________                               ______
                       00-0                                       +-
                        000                                       -+
                     ____________                               ______
                         -0+                                       0
                         +0-
                     ____________                          Add 0+ and ++ ,quotient get +--
                           0

== Square roots and cube roots ==
The process of extracting the square root in balanced ternary is analogous to that in decimal or binary.

$$(10\cdot x+y)^{\mathrm{1T}}-100\cdot x^{\mathrm{1T}}=\mathrm{1T0}\cdot x\cdot y+y^{\mathrm{1T}}=
\begin{cases}
\mathrm{T10}\cdot x+1, & y=\mathrm{T} \\
0, & y=0 \\
\mathrm{1T0}\cdot x+1, & y=1
\end{cases}$$

As in division, we should check the value of half the divisor first. For example,

                             1. 1 1 T 1 T T 0 0 ... 
                           _________________________
                          √ 1T                          1<1T<11, set 1
                           − 1
                            _____
                  1×10=10    1.0T                       1.0T>0.10, set 1
                      1T0   −1.T0
                            ________
                  11×10=110    1T0T                     1T0T>110, set 1
                       10T0   −10T0
                              ________
                 111×10=1110    T1T0T                   T1T0T<TTT0, set T
                       100T0   −T0010
                               _________
                111T×10=111T0    1TTT0T                 1TTT0T>111T0, set 1
                       10T110   −10T110
                                __________
               111T1×10=111T10    TT1TT0T               TT1TT0T<TTT1T0, set T
                       100TTT0   −T001110
                                 ___________
              111T1T×10=111T1T0    T001TT0T             T001TT0T<TTT1T10, set T
                       10T11110   −T01TTTT0
                                  ____________
               111T1TT×10=111T1TT0    T001T0T           TTT1T110<T001T0T<111T1TT0, set 0
                                     −      T           Return 1
                                     ___________
             111T1TT0×10=111T1TT00    T001T000T         TTT1T1100<T001T000T<111T1TT00, set 0
                                     −        T         Return 1
                                     _____________
           111T1TT00*10=111T1TT000    T001T00000T
                                             ... 

Extraction of the cube root in balanced ternary is similarly analogous to extraction in decimal or binary:

$$(10\cdot x+y)^{10}-1000\cdot x^{10}=1000\cdot x^{\mathrm{1T}}\cdot y+100\cdot x\cdot y^{\mathrm{1T}}+y^{10}=
\begin{cases}
\mathrm{T000}\cdot x^{\mathrm{1T}}+100\cdot x+\mathrm{T}, & y=\mathrm{T}\\
0, & y=0\\
1000\cdot x^{\mathrm{1T}}+100\cdot x+1, & y=1
\end{cases}$$

Like division, we should check the value of half the divisor first too. For example:

                              1.  1   T  1  0 ... 
                            _____________________
                         ¹⁰√ 1T
                            − 1                 1<1T<10T,set 1
                            _______
                              1.000
              1×100=100      −0.100             borrow 100×, do division
                             _______
                      1TT     1.T00             1T00>1TT, set 1
          1×1×1000+1=1001    −1.001
                             __________
                                T0T000
            11×100            −   1100           borrow 100×, do division
                              _________
                     10T000     TT1T00           TT1T00<T01000, set T
       11×11×1000+1=1TT1001   −T11T00T
                              ____________
                                1TTT01000
           11T×100             −    11T00        borrow 100×, do division
                               ___________
                   1T1T01TT     1TTTT0100        1TTTT0100>1T1T01TT, set 1
    11T×11T×1000+1=11111001    − 11111001
                               ______________
                                    1T10T000
          11T1×100                 −  11T100      borrow 100×, do division
                                   __________
                      10T0T01TT     1T0T0T00      T01010T11<1T0T0T00<10T0T01TT, set 0
    11T1×11T1×1000+1=1TT1T11001    −  TT1T00      return 100×
                                   _____________
                                    1T10T000000
                                        ... 

Hence ^{3}√2_{dec} = ^{10}√1T_{bal3} = 1.259921_{dec} = 1.1T1 000 111 001 T01 00T 1T1 T10 111_{bal3}.

== Irrational numbers ==
As in any other integer base, algebraic irrationals and transcendental numbers do not terminate or repeat. For example:

Decimal	Balanced ternary
$\sqrt{2}=1.4142135623731\ldots$	$\sqrt{\mathrm{1T}}=\mathrm{1.11T1TT00T00T01T0T00T00T01TT\ldots}$
$\sqrt{3}=1.7320508075689\ldots$	$\sqrt{\mathrm{10}}=\mathrm{1T.T1TT10T0000TT1100T0TTT011T0\ldots}$
$\sqrt{5}=2.2360679774998\ldots$	$\sqrt{\mathrm{1TT}}=\mathrm{1T.1T0101010TTT1TT11010TTT01T1\ldots}$
$\varphi=\frac{1 + \sqrt{5}}{2}=1.6180339887499\ldots$	$\varphi=\frac{1 + \sqrt{\mathrm{1TT}}}{\mathrm{1T}}=\mathrm{1T.T0TT01TT0T10TT11T0011T10011\ldots}$
$\tau=6.28318530717959\ldots$	$\tau=\mathrm{1T0.10TT0T1100T110TT0T1TT000001}\ldots$
$\pi=3.14159265358979\ldots$	$\pi=\mathrm{10.011T111T000T011T1101T111111}\ldots$
$e=2.71828182845905\ldots$	$e=\mathrm{10.T0111TT0T0T111T0111T000T11T}\ldots$

The balanced ternary expansions of $\pi$ is given in OEIS as A331313, that of $e$ in A331990.

== Applications ==
=== In computer design ===
Operation tables

In the early days of computing, a few experimental Soviet computers were built with balanced ternary instead of binary, the most famous being the Setun, built by Nikolay Brusentsov and Sergei Sobolev. The notation has a number of computational advantages over traditional binary and ternary. Particularly, the plus–minus consistency cuts down the carry rate in multi-digit multiplication, and the rounding–truncation equivalence cuts down the carry rate in rounding on fractions. In balanced ternary, the one-digit multiplication table remains one-digit and has no carry and the addition table has only two carries out of nine entries, compared to unbalanced ternary with one and three respectively. Knuth wrote that "Perhaps the symmetric properties and simple arithmetic of this number system will prove to be quite important some day," noting that,

The complexity of arithmetic circuitry for balanced ternary arithmetic is not much greater than it is for the binary system, and a given number requires only $\log_3 2 \approx 63 \%$ as many digit positions for its representation."

More recently, balanced ternary numbers have been proposed for some highly-efficient low-resolution implementations of artificial neural networks. In deep learning, neural nets usually use continuous (floating-point) values, but there are many works investigating quantisation and binarisation to create neural nets that can run with much lower power and/or lower memory requirements. Balanced ternary numbers are proposed to be used for the network parameters, because they are extremely compact, but can naturally represent excitatory/inhibitory/null activation patterns.

Balanced ternary may also provide a more natural representation for the qutrit and quantum computing systems that use it.

=== Other applications ===
The theorem that every integer has a unique representation in balanced ternary was used by Leonhard Euler to justify the identity of formal power series

$$\prod_{n=0}^{\infty} \left(x^{-3^n}+1+x^{3^n}\right)=\sum_{n=-\infty}^{\infty}x^n.$$

Balanced ternary has other applications besides computing. For example, a classical two-pan balance, with one weight for each power of 3, can weigh relatively heavy objects accurately with a small number of weights, by moving weights between the two pans and the table. For example, with weights for each power of 3 through 81, a 60-gram object (60_{dec} = 1T1T0_{bal3}) will be balanced perfectly with an 81 gram weight in the other pan, the 27 gram weight in its own pan, the 9 gram weight in the other pan, the 3 gram weight in its own pan, and the 1 gram weight set aside.

Similarly, consider a currency system with coins worth 1¤, 3¤, 9¤, 27¤, 81¤. If the buyer and the seller each have only one of each kind of coin, any transaction up to 121¤ is possible. For example, if the price is 7¤ (7_{dec} = 1T1_{bal3}), the buyer pays 1¤ + 9¤ and receives 3¤ in change.

== See also ==
- Signed-digit representation
- Methods of computing square roots
- Numeral system
- Qutrit
- Salamis Tablet
- Ternary computer
  - Setun, a ternary computer
- Ternary logic
- Generalized balanced ternary
