= Nikolay Brusentsov =

Russian computer scientist (1925–2014)

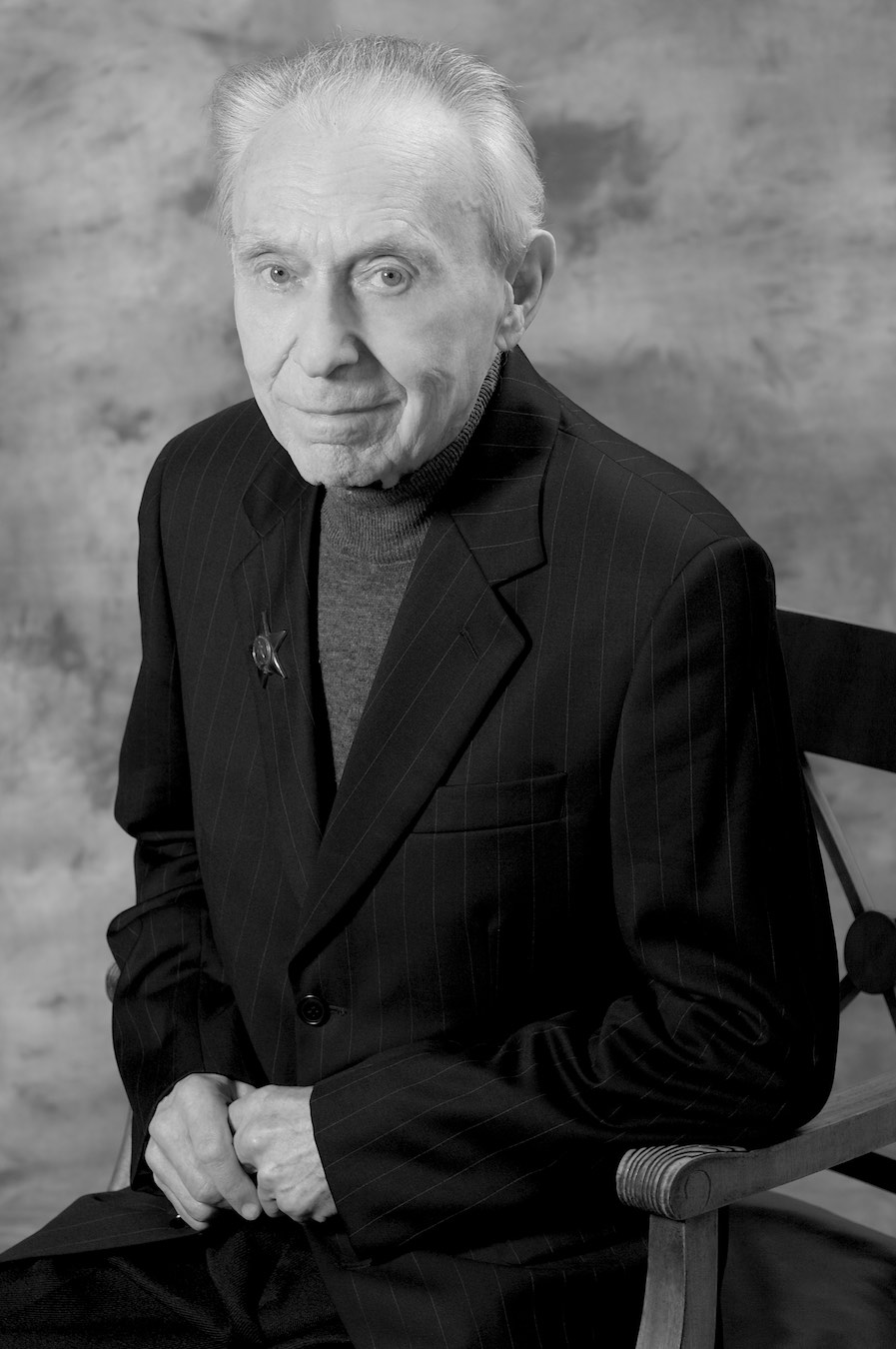
- Born: 7 February 1925; Kamianske Dnipropetrovsk Oblast, Ukrainian SSR, USSR
- Died: 4 December 2014 (aged 89); Moscow, Russia
- Education: Moscow Power Engineering Institute
- Scientific career
- Fields: Mathematical Cybernetics
- Workplaces: Moscow State University

Nikolay Petrovich Brusentsov (Russian: Никола́й Петро́вич Брусенцо́в; 7 February 1925 in Kamianske, Ukrainian SSR – 4 December 2014) was a computer scientist, most famous for having built a (balanced) ternary computer, Setun, together with Sergei Sobolev in 1958. In 1970 he designed Setun 70, implementing principles which were later proposed for the RISC architecture independently. He died on 4 December 2014.

== See also ==
- List of pioneers in computer science
