= Setun =

Soviet ternary computer

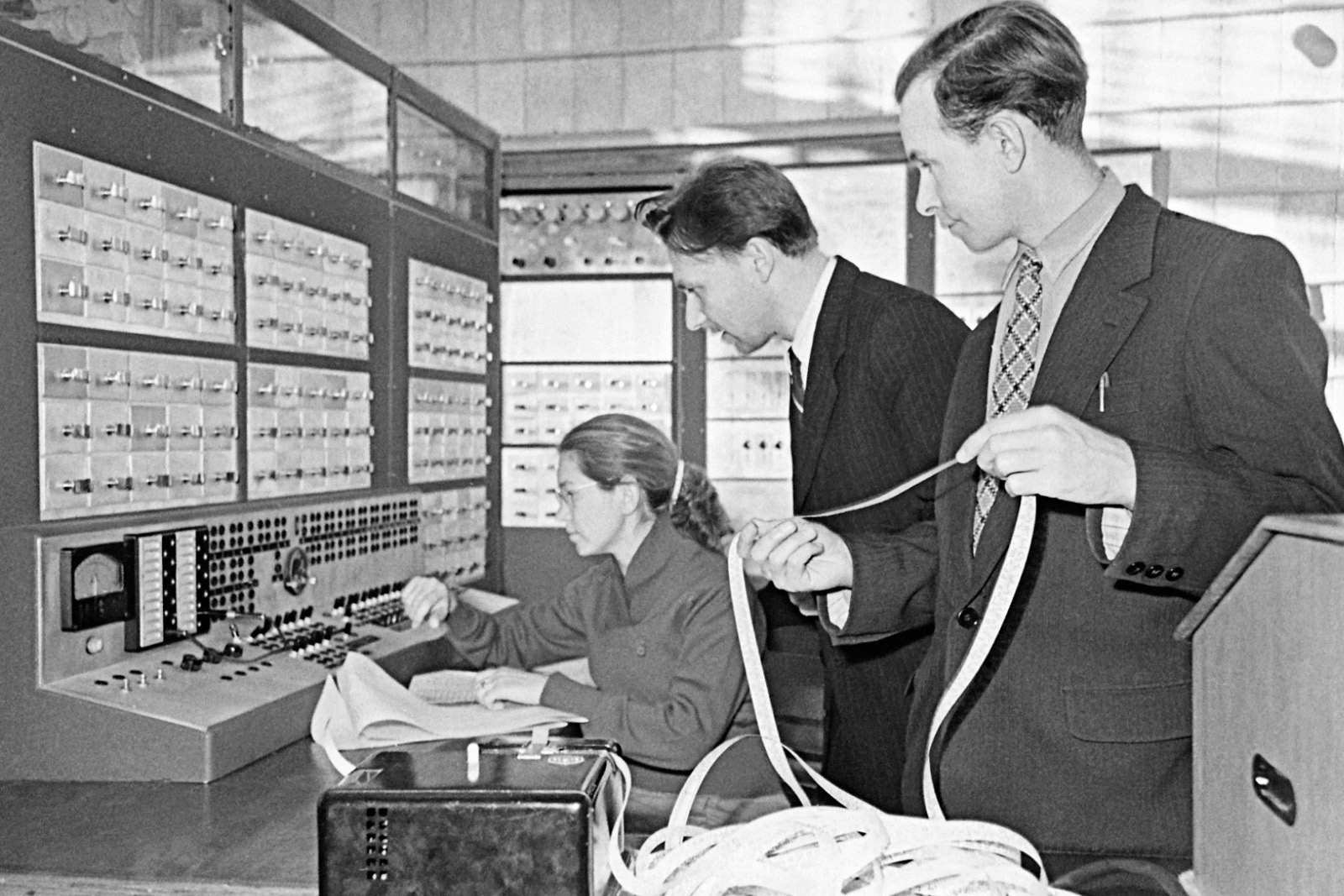
- A photo of a Setun computer in 1959.
- Developer: Sergei Sobolev and Nikolay Brusentsov at Moscow State University
- Manufacturer: Kazan Mathematical plant
- Released: 1959; 67 years ago
- Lifespan: 1959–1965
- Units sold: 50
- Successor: Setun-70

Setun (Russian: Сетунь) was a computer developed in 1958 at Moscow State University. It was built under the leadership of Sergei Sobolev and Nikolay Brusentsov. It was the first modern ternary computer, using the balanced ternary numeral system and three-valued ternary logic instead of the two-valued binary logic prevalent in other computers.

== Overview ==
The computer was built to fulfill the needs of Moscow State University. It was manufactured at the Kazan Mathematical plant. Fifty computers were built from 1959 until 1965, when production was halted. The characteristic operating memory consisted of 81 words of memory, each word composed of 18 trits (ternary digits) with additional 1944 words on magnetic drum (total of about 7 KB). Between 1965 and 1970, a regular binary computer was used at Moscow State University to replace it. Although this replacement binary computer performed equally well, it was 2.5 times the cost of the Setun.

In 1970, a new ternary computer architecture, the Setun-70, was developed. Edsger W. Dijkstra's ideas of structured programming were implemented in the hardware of this computer. The short instructions set was developed and implemented by Nikolay Brusentsov independently from RISC architecture principles.

The Setun-70 hardware architecture was transformed into the Dialogue System of Structured Programming (DSSP). DSSP emulates the "Setun 70" architecture on binary computers, thus it fulfills the advantages of structured programming. DSSP programming language has similar syntax to the Forth programming language but has a different sequence of base instructions, especially conditional jump instructions. DSSP was developed by Nikolay Brusentsov and doctoral students in the 1980s at Moscow State University. A 32-bit version was implemented in 1989.

== History ==
=== Initiation of the project ===
The Setun project was initiated by Sergei Sobolev, in order to develop a small computer for use at the Moscow State University, after the planned transfer of the M-2 computer to the university got canceled in 1953. In 1956, he organized a series of seminars analyzing the disadvantages of existing computers and various plans for technical implementation. These meetings included participants from the Moscow State University, the Institute of Atomic Energy, and other institutes of the Academy of Sciences. Notable attendees include Shura-Bura, Konstantin Adolfovich Semendaev, and Zhogolev. On one of these seminars on April 23, 1956, Nikolay Petrovich Brusentsov was appointed as the executive designer and supervisor of the project.

At the time, Brusentsov was a graduate (equivalent to a master degree, see Education in Russia, traditional model) at Moscow State University, who was graduated from the Moscow Energy Institute. Before appointing Brusentsov as the executive designer of Setun computer, Sobolev transferred Brusentsov to the Mechanics-Mathematics department and sent him to Gutenmakher's laboratory at the Institute for Precision Mechanics to gain relevant experience. To Brusentsov, this was an invaluable experience. In the lab, he had access to the lab's computers and their supporting documentation, which Brusentsov found being "technically weak". Brusentsov then decided to use a ternary number system.

=== Setun computer ===
Sobolev continued to support the project both by finding assistants and participating in the discussions. In 1956, Brusentsov started the design with four engineers and five technicians plus himself. The whole team worked in a 60-square-metre (650 sq ft) room with laboratory tables, where they designed and assembled the machine by hand. Zhogolev worked as the main programmer, and together with him, Brusentsov developed the computer architecture of Setun. In 1958, the team grew to 20 people, and the first model of the Setun computer was assembled. The name Setun comes from a river near the University.

After the first model of Setun was built, the Kazan Mathematical Machines Factory was decreed by the Soviet Cabinet of Ministers to mass-produce the Setun computers. However, the leadership at the Kazan plant was not interested in large-scale computer production. The second model built in the factory was sent back because the plant managers and officials maintained that the computer was not yet reliable. The team was forced to manually adjust the second model. On November 30, 1961, the director of the Kazan factory was forced to sign an act which ended the attempts to cease the production of the Setun computer. The computers were then produced at the rate of 15-20 machines annually until 1965, when the plant refused to continue the production as the sale price of the computer was too low.

While Setun attracted significant interest from abroad, the Ministry of Foreign Trade never filled the orders received. Only 50 Setun computers have been manufactured, 30 of which were used in the higher education institutions inside the Soviet Union.

=== Setun-70 computer ===
Between 1961 and 1968, Brusentsov and Zhogolev developed Setun-70, the next generation of Setun computer with a new architecture. It was designed for effective software development, in which the ternary system played a key role. Both addresses and operations are in syllables, where each syllable's length equals to 6 trits (about 9.5 bits). Algebraic expressions of operands by syllables replace the instructions as words in the traditional design, as the instruction set is updated to allow more variance of operand length. The algebra is supplemented by testing, control, and input-output operations. The user can add operations on their own without reducing the computer's performance, thus providing the ideal conditions for structured programming. Brusentsov claimed that the programming time on Setun-70 is reduced by five to tenfold with unprecedented reliability, clarity, compactness and speed.

The functioning algorithm of Setun-70 was comprehensively described in expanded Algol-60.

=== End of the Setun project ===
The new university rector considered Brusentsov's research and computer design a pseudo-science. After the Setun-70 project, Brusentsov's lab was relocated from the computer center at Moscow State University to an attic in a student dormitory, and the original prototype of the Setun computer was destroyed. The Setun-70 model was taken to the new attic laboratory and was used as a basis for developing the educational computer system Master Work Station.

== Adoption and application ==
The Setun architecture, as well as its programming system contributed in its adoption by users in universities, industrial plants, and research institutes. The programming system included the following interpreters—IP-2 (floating-point, 8 decimal digits), IP-3 (floating-point, 6 decimal digits), IP-4 (complex numbers, 8 decimal digits), IP-5 (floating-point, 12 decimal digits)—plus the POLIZ autocode with its operating system and standard subroutine library (floating-point, 6 decimal digits). The computers were used for tasks including scientific modeling and engineering calculations to weather forecasting and enterprise management optimization.

At user seminars on the Setun computers—held at Moscow State University (1965), the Lyudinovo Diesel-Locomotive Plant (1968), and Irkutsk Polytechnic Institute (1969)—dozens of reports were presented on successful real-world applications for the national economy. Owing to its balanced ternary code, Setun earned a strong reputation, particularly as an educational tool for teaching computational mathematics in more than thirty universities. At the Zhukovsky Air Force Engineering Academy, Setun even became the platform for the first automated computer-based learning system.

== Critics ==
Brian Hayes argues in his article Third Base that Brusentsov did not realize the theoretical advantage of the base 3 system:

Unfortunately, Setun did not realize the potential of base 3 to reduce component counts. Each trit was stored in a pair of magnetic cores, wired in tandem so that they had three stable states. A pair of cores could have held two binary bits, which amounts to more information than a single trit, and so the ternary advantage was squandered.

== Compared to binary computers ==
Despite the ternary design never becoming massively produced, there have been discussions on the advantages of the ternary system over the binary system, and great interest was present on the ternary and more generally on the multi-valued logic systems in the academy. Brusentsov found the ternary number system superior to the binary number system: it allowed him to create very simple and reliable elements, and he needed only one seventh as many elements as Gutenmakher's computers. The power source requirements were also significantly reduced because fewer magnetic rods and diodes were used. He also found the natural number-coding system used in the ternary system superior over the direct, reciprocal and supplementary number coding used in the binary system. He maintained that the ternary system is superior to binary in most aspects and published several papers advocating the ternary system from 1985 until his death in 2014.

== See also ==
- History of computing in the Soviet Union
