= Addition-subtraction chain =

An addition-subtraction chain, a generalization of addition chains to include subtraction, is a sequence a_{0}, a_{1}, a_{2}, a_{3}, ... that satisfies

$$a_0 = 1, \,$$
$$\text{for }k > 0,\ a_k = a_i \pm a_j\text{ for some }0 \leq i,j < k.$$

An addition-subtraction chain for n, of length L, is an addition-subtraction chain such that $a_L = n$. That is, one can thereby compute n by L additions and/or subtractions. (Note that n need not be positive. In this case, one may also include a_{−1} = 0 in the sequence, so that n = −1 can be obtained by a chain of length 1.)

By definition, every addition chain is also an addition-subtraction chain, but not vice versa. Therefore, the length of the shortest addition-subtraction chain for n is bounded above by the length of the shortest addition chain for n. In general, however, the determination of a minimal addition-subtraction chain (like the problem of determining a minimum addition chain) is a difficult problem for which no efficient algorithms are currently known. The related problem of finding an optimal addition sequence is NP-complete (Downey et al., 1981), but it is not known for certain whether finding optimal addition or addition-subtraction chains is NP-hard.

For example, one addition-subtraction chain is: $a_0=1$, $a_1=2=1+1$, $a_2=4=2+2$, $a_3=3=4-1$. This is not a minimal addition-subtraction chain for n=3, however, because we could instead have chosen $a_2=3=2+1$. The smallest n for which an addition-subtraction chain is shorter than the minimal addition chain is n=31, which can be computed in only 6 additions (rather than 7 for the minimal addition chain):

$$a_0=1,\ a_1=2=1+1,\ a_2=4=2+2,\ a_3=8=4+4,\ a_4=16=8+8,\ a_5=32=16+16,\ a_6=31=32-1.$$

Like an addition chain, an addition-subtraction chain can be used for addition-chain exponentiation: given the addition-subtraction chain of length L for n, the power $x^n$ can be computed by multiplying or dividing by x L times, where the subtractions correspond to divisions. This is potentially efficient in problems where division is an inexpensive operation, most notably for exponentiation on elliptic curves where division corresponds to a mere sign change (as proposed by Morain and Olivos, 1990).

Some hardware multipliers multiply by n using an addition chain described by n in binary:

n = 31 = 0  0  0  1   1  1  1  1 (binary).

Other hardware multipliers multiply by n using an addition-subtraction chain described by n in Booth encoding:

n = 31 = 0  0  1  0   0  0  0 −1 (Booth encoding).
