= Vectorial addition chain =

Sequence of k-dimensional vectors

In mathematics, for positive integers k and s, a vectorial addition chain is a sequence V of k-dimensional vectors v_{i} of nonnegative integers for −k + 1 ≤ i ≤ s together with a sequence w, such that

v_{−k+1} = [1, 0, 0, ..., 0, 0],
v_{−k+2} = [0, 1, 0, ..., 0, 0],

⋮
⋮

v_{0} = [0, 0, 0, ..., 0, 1],

v_{i} = v_{j} + v_{r} for all 1 ≤ i ≤ s with −k + 1 ≤ j, r ≤ i − 1,
v_{s} = [n_{0}, ..., n_{k−1}],
w = (w_{1}, ..., w_{s}), w_{i} = (j, r).

For example, a vectorial addition chain for [22, 18, 3] is

V = ([1, 0, 0], [0, 1, 0], [0, 0, 1], [1, 1, 0], [2, 2, 0], [4, 4, 0], [5, 4, 0], [10, 8, 0], [11, 9, 0], [11, 9, 1], [22, 18, 2], [22, 18, 3])
w = ((−2, −1), (1, 1), (2, 2), (−2, 3), (4, 4), (1, 5), (0, 6), (7, 7), (0, 8))

Vectorial addition chains are well suited to perform multi-exponentiation:

Input: Elements x_{0}, ..., x_{k−1} of an abelian group G and a vectorial addition chain of dimension k computing [n_{0}, ..., n_{k−1}]
Output: The element x_{0}^{n_{0}}...x_{k−1}^{n_{r−1}}
1. for i = −k + 1 to 0 do y_{i} → x_{i+k−1}
2. for i = 1 to s do y_{i} → y_{j} × y_{r}
3. return y_{s}

== Addition sequence ==
An addition sequence for the set of integer S = {n_{0}, ..., n_{r−1}} is an addition chain v that contains every element of S.

For example, an addition sequence computing

{47, 117, 343, 499}

is

(1, 2, 4, 8, 10, 11, 18, 36, 47, 55, 91, 109, 117, 226, 343, 434, 489, 499).

It is possible to find addition sequence from vectorial addition chains and conversely, so they are in a sense dual.

== See also ==
- Addition chain
- Addition-chain exponentiation
- Exponentiation by squaring
- Non-adjacent form
