= Advanced Learning and Research Institute =

Research institution in Ticino, Switzerland

- Type: Graduate
- Established: 1999
- Director: Cesare Alippi
- Postgraduates: >200 (2016)
- Location: Via G. Buffi 13, CH-6904 Lugano, Lugano, Ticino, Switzerland; 46.01072°N 8.9585°E
- Website: www.alari.ch

The Advanced Learning and Research Institute (ALaRI) was a research and education institute of Università della Svizzera italiana, in Lugano, Switzerland. The institute focused on cyber-physical and embedded systems and offered international master programs.

ALaRI was established in 1999 at the Università della Svizzera italiana (USI) in Lugano, to promote research and education in embedded systems and, later, it was incorporated into the Faculty of Informatics of the same university. In 2021, ALaRI has merged with the Dalle Molle Institute for Artificial Intelligence and it was transformed into the Graph Machine Learning Group (GMLG).

Over the years, the institute graduated more than 200 students from all around the world and affiliated researchers published more than 350 scientific papers.

ALaRI offered two principal graduate programs: a two-year Master of Science in Cyber-Physical and Embedded Systems and a one-year Master of Advanced Studies in Embedded Systems Design. Its faculty comprised researchers active internationally in embedded systems and related fields, contributing to both fundamental and applied research.

== History of ALaRI ==
ALaRI was founded in 1999 at Università della Svizzera italiana (Lugano, Switzerland) to fill up a research and educational gap in embedded systems by ex-Rector of Politecnico di Milano, Prof. Luigi Dadda, Prof. Mariagiovanna Sami (Politecnico di Milano) and Prof. Giovani de Micheli (Stanford University, currently EPFL-Lausanne) with support of industry, especially ST Microelectronics and Hewlett-Packard who became major supporters of the institute. Also, companies such as Bosch, csem and imec, among others, provided support in the form of internships for students. In 2005, ALaRI was fully incorporated into the Faculty of Informatics of Università della Svizzera italiana.

ALaRI offered master's degrees in cyber-physical and Embedded systems in cooperation with some of the most prominent universities in Europe: Politecnico di Milano and the Swiss Federal Institute of Technology in Zurich (ETHZ). Each course was taught in a one- or two-week-period, such that students could totally focus on a given topic, by top-notch faculty from renowned European universities.

=== Directors of the Institute ===
The directors of the Institute include Prof. Mariagiovanna Sami (1999–2012, part time from the Politecnico di Milano), Prof. Miroslaw Malek (2012–2017, full time from the Humboldt University of Berlin) and then, from 2018, Prof. Cesare Alippi, who is now in charge of the new incarnation of ALaRI, the Graph Machine Learning Group.

Prof. Luigi Dadda was the president of ALaRI from 1999 to 2012.

=== Research ===
More than 350 publications from researchers affiliated with ALaRI were published, over the lifespan of the institute, in scientific conferences, journals, and books.

The institute participated to more than 50 funded projects (Swiss National Science Foundation, European projects, Innosuisse, and other funding agencies).

The research directions were gradually changing with Institute director:

- With Prof. Mariagiovanna Sami, the group's research was focused on various aspects of digital architecture design, with particular reference to fault testing and fault-tolerance of digital architectures, parallel architectures, embedded systems, security of embedded systems, hardware/software co-design, low-power design and high-level synthesis.
- Since Prof. Miroslaw Malek took over in 2012, the research focus was on dependable and secure architectures and services in parallel, cloud, distributed and embedded computing environments including failure prediction and service availability, using among others, AI/ML methodologies.
- When Prof. Cesare Alippi stepped in 2018, he has focused the group's research on topics such as graph machine learning, non-stationary environments, spatiotemporal data, reinforcement learning and dynamical systems.

Several ALaRI graduates continued research at the Institute and completed PhD dissertations.

=== Education ===
More than 200 students from all around the world graduated at ALaRI over the years. ALaRI graduates work at universities, research centers, Fortune 500 companies, and startups worldwide.

ALaRI offered two main educational programs until 2016:

- "Master of Science in Cyber-Physical and Embedded Systems" (previously called "Master of Science in Embedded Systems Design"): this master, in cooperation with Politecnico di Milano and the Swiss Federal Institute of Technology in Zurich (ETHZ), aimed at training application designers and system developers, by integrating different areas such as microelectronics, physical modeling, computer science, machine learning, telecommunication, and control, and focusing on the most advanced applications. The program was designed for students holding a bachelor's degree in Computer Science, Computer Engineering and, more in general, in the domain of Information and Communication Technologies and it was built around three major methodological pillars: the interaction with the physical world, the embedded (networked) system, and the embedded applications. The study program of the Master of Science in Cyber-Physical and Embedded Systems consisted of four full-time study semesters (120 ECTS over two years). The thesis started during the third semester and was completed by the end of the fourth. To broaden the student's perspective, up to 18 ECTS could be obtained with elective courses chosen from the program.
- "Master of Advanced Studies in Embedded Systems Design": this one-year master was conceived as a professional program providing a comprehensive grounding in the Embedded Systems Design themes in order to prepare (or to re-skill) team leaders and researchers through studies in a very international environment. This program, more flexible and shorter, but also more intensive than MSc, covered 70 ECTS and addressed more experienced candidates through high quality courses and a thesis project.
