= Eduard Selling =

German mathematician

Portrait of Eduard Selling

Eduard Selling (5 November 1834 in Ansbach – 31 January 1920 in Munich) was a German mathematician and inventor of calculating machines.

Selling studied mathematics at the University of Göttingen and the Ludwig-Maximilians-Universität München (under Philipp Ludwig von Seidel). He obtained the doctorate at the Ludwig-Maximilians-Universität München in 1859, under the supervision of Bernhard Riemann. (Note: Selling (1859): Über Primzahlen und die Zusammensetzung der Zahlen aus ihnen in dem rationellen und in complex-irrationellen Zahlengebieten) On recommendation of Leopold Kronecker, he became professor extraordinarius of mathematics at the University of Würzburg in 1860 – against the will of the philosophical faculty and the mathematics professor Aloys Mayr. There, he also taught astronomy and became conservator-restorer at the astronomical department in 1879. In 1873 he wrote an important paper on binary and ternary quadratic forms which was also translated into French and cited by Henri Poincaré, Émile Picard and Paul Gustav Heinrich Bachmann. Beginning with 1877, he also became concerned with insurance, and participated in the reorganization of the pensions in Bavaria on behalf of the Bavarian government. His application for a promotion to professor ordinarius was declined in 1891. In 1906, he became emeritus.

For his own extensive computations (for instance, signed-digit representation), he initially used computational machines by Thomas de Colmar with which he was not satisfied. Therefore, he built multiplication machines after the model of a Pantograph, for which he got a patent in 1886, and a prize at the Chicago World's Fair in 1893. However, the machine was complicated to use and to produce, so it didn't gain much importance. Some 30 to 40 devices were produced until 1898. He also built a few copies of an improved version and designed a third electrical machine (patent in 1894). The later inventor of computational machines, Christel Hamann, participated in those constructions. Some copies of Selling's machine can be seen, for instance, in the Deutsches Museum in Munich.
