= Alfred Brauer =

German-American mathematician

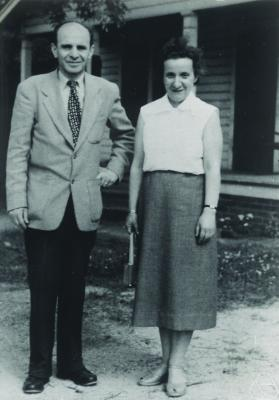
- Born: April 9, 1894; Charlottenburg, Germany
- Died: December 23, 1985 (aged 91); North Carolina
- Education: University of Berlin
- Relatives: Richard Brauer (brother)
- Scientific career
- Fields: Mathematics
- Workplaces: University of North Carolina at Chapel Hill; Wake Forest University
- Thesis: Über diophantische Gleichungen mit endlich vielen Lösungen (1928)
- Doctoral advisors: Issai Schur; Erhard Schmidt
- Doctoral students: Emilie Virginia Haynsworth; Leo Moser

Alfred Theodor Brauer (April 9, 1894 – December 23, 1985) was a German-American mathematician who did work in number theory. He was born in Charlottenburg, and studied at the University of Berlin. As he served Germany in World War I, even being injured in the war, he was able to keep his position longer than many other Jewish academics who had been forced out after Hitler's rise to power. In 1935 he lost his position and in 1938 he tried to leave Germany, but was not able to until the following year. He initially worked in the Northeast, but in 1942 he settled into a position at the University of North Carolina at Chapel Hill. A good deal of his works, and the Alfred T. Brauer library, would be linked to this university. He occasionally taught at Wake Forest University after he retired from Chapel Hill at 70. He died in North Carolina, aged 91.

He was the brother of the mathematician Richard Brauer, who was the founder of modular representation theory.

== See also ==
- Brauer chain
- Scholz–Brauer conjecture
