= Signed-digit representation =

Positional system with signed digits; the representation may not be unique

In mathematical notation for numbers, a signed-digit representation is a positional numeral system with a set of signed digits used to encode the integers.

Signed-digit representation can be used to accomplish fast addition of integers because it can eliminate chains of dependent carries. In the binary numeral system, a special case signed-digit representation is the non-adjacent form, which can offer speed benefits with minimal space overhead.

== History ==
Challenges in calculation stimulated early authors Colson (1726) and Cauchy (1840) to use signed-digit representation. The further step of replacing negated digits with new ones was suggested by Selling (1887) and Cajori (1928).

In 1928, Florian Cajori noted the recurring theme of signed digits, starting with Colson (1726) and Cauchy (1840). In his book A History of Mathematical Notations, Cajori titled the section "Negative numerals". For completeness, Colson uses examples and describes addition (pp. 163–4), multiplication (pp. 165–6) and division (pp. 170–1) using a table of multiples of the divisor. He explains the convenience of approximation by truncation in multiplication. Colson also devised an instrument (Counting Table) that calculated using signed digits.

Eduard Selling advocated inverting the digits 1, 2, 3, 4, and 5 to indicate the negative sign. He also suggested snie, jes, jerd, reff, and niff as names to use vocally. Most of the other early sources used a bar over a digit to indicate a negative sign for it. Another German usage of signed-digits was described in 1902 in Klein's encyclopedia.

== Definition and properties ==
=== Digit set ===
Let $\mathcal{D}$ be a finite set of numerical digits with cardinality $b > 1$ (If $b \leq 1$, then the positional number system is trivial and only represents the trivial ring), with each digit denoted as $d_i$ for $0 \leq i < b.$ $b$ is known as the radix or number base. $\mathcal{D}$ can be used for a signed-digit representation if it's associated with a unique function $f_\mathcal{D}:\mathcal{D}\rightarrow\mathbb{Z}$ such that $f_\mathcal{D}(d_i) \equiv i \bmod b$ for all $0 \leq i < b.$ This function, $f_{\mathcal{D}},$ is what rigorously and formally establishes how integer values are assigned to the symbols/glyphs in $\mathcal{D}.$ One benefit of this formalism is that the definition of "the integers" (however they may be defined) is not conflated with any particular system for writing/representing them; in this way, these two distinct (albeit closely related) concepts are kept separate.

$\mathcal{D}$ can be partitioned into three distinct sets $\mathcal{D}_{+}$, $\mathcal{D}_{0}$, and $\mathcal{D}_{-}$, representing the positive, zero, and negative digits respectively, such that all digits $d_{+}\in\mathcal{D}_{+}$ satisfy $f_\mathcal{D}(d_{+}) > 0$, all digits $d_{0}\in\mathcal{D}_{0}$ satisfy $f_\mathcal{D}(d_{0}) = 0$ and all digits $d_{-}\in\mathcal{D}_{-}$ satisfy $f_\mathcal{D}(d_{-}) < 0$. The cardinality of $\mathcal{D}_{+}$ is $b_{+}$, the cardinality of $\mathcal{D}_{0}$ is $b_{0}$, and the cardinality of $\mathcal{D}_{-}$ is $b_{-}$, giving the number of positive and negative digits respectively, such that $b = b_{+} + b_{0} + b_{-}$.

==== Balanced form representations ====
Balanced form representations are representations where for every positive digit $d_{+}$, there exist a corresponding negative digit $d_{-}$ such that $f_\mathcal{D}(d_{+}) = -f_\mathcal{D}(d_{-})$. It follows that $b_{+} = b_{-}$. For odd bases $b$, the used digits are $-(b-1)/2$ to $(b-1)/2$, and for even bases $b$, the used digits are $-b/2$ to $b/2$, but for even bases $b$, the digits $-b/2$ and $b/2$ may not be followed by an odd digit, the spacial case of $b=2$ is exactly the non-adjacent form. In balanced form, the negative digits $d_{-}\in\mathcal{D}_{-}$ are usually denoted as positive digits with a bar over the digit, as $d_{-} = \bar{d}_{+}$ for $d_{+}\in\mathcal{D}_{+}$. For example, the digit set of balanced ternary would be $\mathcal{D}_{3} = \lbrace\bar{1},0,1\rbrace$ with $f_{\mathcal{D}_{3}}(\bar{1}) = -1$, $f_{\mathcal{D}_{3}}(0) = 0$, and $f_{\mathcal{D}_{3}}(1) = 1$. This convention is adopted in finite fields of odd prime order $q$:

$$\mathbb{F}_{q} = \lbrace0, 1, \bar{1} = -1,... d = \frac{q - 1}{2},\ \bar{d} = \frac{1-q}{2}\ |\ q = 0\rbrace.$$

In the table below, use $Z, Y, X, \dots$ to represent $-1, -2, -3, \dots$

Decimal	Balanced binary (balanced base 2)	Balanced ternary (balanced base 3)	Balanced quaternary (balanced base 4)	Balanced quinary (balanced base 5)	Balanced senary (balanced base 6)	Balanced septenary (balanced base 7)	Balaced octal (balanced base 8)	Balaced nonary (balanced base 9)	Balanced decimal (balanced base 10)
0	0	0	0	0	0	0	0	0	0
1	1	1	1	1	1	1	1	1	1
2	10	1Z	2	2	2	2	2	2	2
3	10Z	10	1Z	1Y	3	3	3	3	3
4	100	11	10	1Z	1Y	1X	4	4	4
5	101	1ZZ	11	10	1Z	1Y	1X	1W	5
6	10Z0	1Z0	2Y	11	10	1Z	1Y	1X	1W
7	100Z	1Z1	2Z	12	11	10	1Z	1Y	1X
8	1000	10Z	20	2Y	12	11	10	1Z	1Y
9	1001	100	21	2Z	2X	12	11	10	1Z
10	1010	101	22	20	2Y	13	12	11	10
11	10Z0Z	11Z	1ZZ	21	2Z	2X	13	12	11
12	10Z00	110	1Z0	22	20	2Y	2W	13	12
13	10Z01	111	1Z1	1YY	21	2Z	2X	14	13
14	100Z0	1ZZZ	10Y	1YZ	22	20	2Y	2W	14
15	1000Z	1ZZ0	10Z	1Y0	23	21	2Z	2X	2V
16	10000	1ZZ1	100	1Y1	3Y	22	20	2Y	2W
17	10001	1Z0Z	101	1Y2	3Z	23	21	2Z	2X
18	10010	1Z00	102	1ZY	30	3X	22	20	2Y
19	10011	1Z01	11Z	1ZZ	31	3Y	23	21	2Z
20	10100	1Z1Z	110	1Z0	32	3Z	24	22	20
21	10101	1Z10	111	1Z1	1YX	30	3X	23	21
22	10Z0Z0	1Z11	2YY	1Z2	1YY	31	3Y	24	22
23	10Z00Z	10ZZ	2YZ	10Y	1YZ	32	3Z	3W	23
24	10Z000	10Z0	2Y0	10Z	1Y0	33	30	3X	24
25	10Z001	10Z1	2Y1	100	1Y1	1XX	31	3Y	25

==== Dual signed-digit representation ====
Every digit set $\mathcal{D}$ has a dual digit set $\mathcal{D}^\operatorname{op}$ given by the inverse order of the digits with an isomorphism $g:\mathcal{D}\rightarrow\mathcal{D}^\operatorname{op}$ defined by $-f_\mathcal{D} = g\circ f_{\mathcal{D}^\operatorname{op}}$. As a result, for any signed-digit representations $\mathcal{N}$ of a number system ring $N$ constructed from $\mathcal{D}$ with valuation $v_\mathcal{D}:\mathcal{N}\rightarrow N$, there exists a dual signed-digit representations of $N$, $\mathcal{N}^\operatorname{op}$, constructed from $\mathcal{D}^\operatorname{op}$ with valuation $v_{\mathcal{D}^\operatorname{op}}:\mathcal{N}^\operatorname{op}\rightarrow N$, and an isomorphism $h:\mathcal{N}\rightarrow\mathcal{N}^\operatorname{op}$ defined by $-v_\mathcal{D} = h\circ v_{\mathcal{D}^\operatorname{op}}$, where $-$ is the additive inverse operator of $N$. The digit set for balanced form representations is self-dual.

=== For integers ===
Given the digit set $\mathcal{D}$ and function $f:\mathcal{D}\rightarrow\mathbb{Z}$ as defined above, let us define an integer endofunction $T:\mathbb{Z}\rightarrow\mathbb{Z}$ as the following:

$$T(n) =
\begin{cases}
\frac{n - f(d_i)}{b} &\text{if } n \equiv i \bmod b, 0 \leq i < b
\end{cases}$$

If the only periodic point of $T$ is the fixed point $0$, then the set of all signed-digit representations of the integers $\mathbb{Z}$ using $\mathcal{D}$ is given by the Kleene plus $\mathcal{D}^+$, the set of all finite concatenated strings of digits $d_n \ldots d_0$ with at least one digit, with $n\in\mathbb{N}$. Each signed-digit representation $m \in \mathcal{D}^+$ has a valuation $v_\mathcal{D}:\mathcal{D}^+\rightarrow\mathbb{Z}$

$$v_\mathcal{D}(m) = \sum_{i=0}^{n}f_\mathcal{D}(d_{i})b^{i}$$.

Examples include balanced ternary with digits $\mathcal{D} = \lbrace \bar{1}, 0, 1\rbrace$.

Otherwise, if there exist a non-zero periodic point of $T$, then there exist integers that are represented by an infinite number of non-zero digits in $\mathcal{D}$. Examples include the standard decimal numeral system with the digit set $\operatorname{dec} = \lbrace 0, 1, 2, 3, 4, 5, 6, 7, 8, 9 \rbrace$, which requires an infinite number of the digit $9$ to represent the additive inverse $-1$, as $T_\operatorname{dec}(-1) = \frac{-1 - 9}{10} = -1$, and the positional numeral system with the digit set $\mathcal{D} = \lbrace \text{A}, 0, 1\rbrace$ with $f(\text{A}) = -4$, which requires an infinite number of the digit $\text{A}$ to represent the number $2$, as $T_\mathcal{D}(2) = \frac{2 - (-4)}{3} = 2$.

=== For decimal fractions ===
If the integers can be represented by the Kleene plus $\mathcal{D}^+$, then the set of all signed-digit representations of the decimal fractions, or $b$-adic rationals $\mathbb{Z}[1\backslash b]$, is given by $\mathcal{Q} = \mathcal{D}^+\times\mathcal{P}\times\mathcal{D}^*$, the Cartesian product of the Kleene plus $\mathcal{D}^+$, the set of all finite concatenated strings of digits $d_n \ldots d_0$ with at least one digit, the singleton $\mathcal{P}$ consisting of the radix point ($.$ or $,$), and the Kleene star $\mathcal{D}^*$, the set of all finite concatenated strings of digits $d_{-1} \ldots d_{-m}$, with $m,n\in\mathbb{N}$. Each signed-digit representation $q \in \mathcal{Q}$ has a valuation $v_\mathcal{D}:\mathcal{Q}\rightarrow\mathbb{Z}[1\backslash b]$

$$v_\mathcal{D}(q) = \sum_{i=-m}^{n}f_\mathcal{D}(d_{i})b^{i}$$

=== For real numbers ===
If the integers can be represented by the Kleene plus $\mathcal{D}^+$, then the set of all signed-digit representations of the real numbers $\mathbb{R}$ is given by $\mathcal{R} = \mathcal{D}^+ \times \mathcal{P} \times \mathcal{D}^\mathbb{N}$, the Cartesian product of the Kleene plus $\mathcal{D}^+$, the set of all finite concatenated strings of digits $d_n \ldots d_0$ with at least one digit, the singleton $\mathcal{P}$ consisting of the radix point ($.$ or $,$), and the Cantor space $\mathcal{D}^\mathbb{N}$, the set of all infinite concatenated strings of digits $d_{-1} d_{-2} \ldots$, with $n\in\mathbb{N}$. Each signed-digit representation $r \in \mathcal{R}$ has a valuation $v_\mathcal{D}:\mathcal{R}\rightarrow\mathbb{R}$

$$v_\mathcal{D}(r) = \sum_{i=-\infty}^{n}f_\mathcal{D}(d_{i})b^{i}$$.

The infinite series always converges to a finite real number.

=== For other number systems ===
All base-$b$ numerals can be represented as a subset of $\mathcal{D}^\mathbb{Z}$, the set of all doubly infinite sequences of digits in $\mathcal{D}$, where $\mathbb{Z}$ is the set of integers, and the ring of base-$b$ numerals is represented by the formal power series ring $\mathbb{Z}[[b,b^{-1}]]$, the doubly infinite series

$$\sum_{i = -\infty}^{\infty}a_i b^i$$

where $a_i\in\mathbb{Z}$ for $i\in\mathbb{Z}$.

==== Integers modulo powers of b ====
The set of all signed-digit representations of the integers modulo $b^n$, $\mathbb{Z}\backslash b^n\mathbb{Z}$ is given by the set $\mathcal{D}^n$, the set of all finite concatenated strings of digits $d_{n - 1} \ldots d_0$ of length $n$, with $n\in\mathbb{N}$. Each signed-digit representation $m \in \mathcal{D}^n$ has a valuation $v_\mathcal{D}:\mathcal{D}^n\rightarrow\mathbb{Z}/b^n\mathbb{Z}$

$$v_\mathcal{D}(m) \equiv \sum_{i=0}^{n - 1}f_\mathcal{D}(d_{i})b^{i} \bmod b^n$$

==== Prüfer groups ====
A Prüfer group is the quotient group $\mathbb{Z}(b^\infty) = \mathbb{Z}[1\backslash b]/\mathbb{Z}$ of the integers and the $b$-adic rationals. The set of all signed-digit representations of the Prüfer group is given by the Kleene star $\mathcal{D}^*$, the set of all finite concatenated strings of digits $d_{1} \ldots d_{n}$, with $n\in\mathbb{N}$. Each signed-digit representation $p \in \mathcal{D}^*$ has a valuation $v_\mathcal{D}:\mathcal{D}^*\rightarrow\mathbb{Z}(b^\infty)$

$$v_\mathcal{D}(m) \equiv \sum_{i=1}^{n}f_\mathcal{D}(d_{i})b^{-i} \bmod 1$$

==== Circle group ====
The circle group is the quotient group $\mathbb{T} = \mathbb{R}/\mathbb{Z}$ of the integers and the real numbers. The set of all signed-digit representations of the circle group is given by the Cantor space $\mathcal{D}^\mathbb{N}$, the set of all right-infinite concatenated strings of digits $d_{1} d_{2} \ldots$. Each signed-digit representation $m \in \mathcal{D}^n$ has a valuation $v_\mathcal{D}:\mathcal{D}^\mathbb{N}\rightarrow\mathbb{T}$

$$v_\mathcal{D}(m) \equiv \sum_{i=1}^{\infty}f_\mathcal{D}(d_{i})b^{-i} \bmod 1$$

The infinite series always converges.

==== b-adic integers ====
The set of all signed-digit representations of the $b$-adic integers, $\mathbb{Z}_b$ is given by the Cantor space $\mathcal{D}^\mathbb{N}$, the set of all left-infinite concatenated strings of digits $\ldots d_{1} d_{0}$. Each signed-digit representation $m \in \mathcal{D}^n$ has a valuation $v_\mathcal{D}:\mathcal{D}^\mathbb{N}\rightarrow\mathbb{Z}_{b}$

$$v_\mathcal{D}(m) = \sum_{i=0}^{\infty}f_\mathcal{D}(d_{i})b^{i}$$

==== b-adic solenoids ====
The set of all signed-digit representations of the $b$-adic solenoids, $\mathbb{T}_b$ is given by the Cantor space $\mathcal{D}^\mathbb{Z}$, the set of all doubly infinite concatenated strings of digits $\ldots d_{1} d_{0} d_{-1} \ldots$. Each signed-digit representation $m \in \mathcal{D}^n$ has a valuation $v_\mathcal{D}:\mathcal{D}^\mathbb{Z}\rightarrow\mathbb{T}_{b}$

$$v_\mathcal{D}(m) = \sum_{i=-\infty}^{\infty}f_\mathcal{D}(d_{i})b^{i}$$

== In written and spoken language ==
=== Indo-Aryan languages ===
The oral and written forms of numbers in the Indo-Aryan languages use a negative numeral (e.g., "un" in Hindi and Bengali, "un" or "unna" in Punjabi, "ekon" in Marathi) for the numbers between 11 and 90 that end with a nine. The numbers followed by their names are shown for Punjabi below (the prefix "ik" means "one"):

- 19 unni, 20 vih, 21 ikki
- 29 unatti, 30 tih, 31 ikatti
- 39 untali, 40 chali, 41 iktali
- 49 unanja, 50 panjah, 51 ikvanja
- 59 unahat, 60 sath, 61 ikahat
- 69 unattar, 70 sattar, 71 ikhattar
- 79 unasi, 80 assi, 81 ikiasi
- 89 unanve, 90 nabbe, 91 ikinnaven.

Similarly, the Sesotho language utilizes negative numerals to form 8's and 9's.

- 8 robeli (/Ro-bay-dee/) meaning "break two" i.e. two fingers down
- 9 robong (/Ro-bong/) meaning "break one" i.e. one finger down

=== Classical Latin ===
In Classical Latin, integers 18 and 19 had in practice neither spoken nor written form, even corresponding parts for "eight" or "nine –despite them being in existence. Instead, in Classic Latin,

- 18 = duodēvīgintī ("two taken from twenty"), (IIXX or XIIX),
- 19 = ūndēvīgintī ("one taken from twenty"), (IXX or XIX)
- 20 = vīgintī ("twenty"), (XX).

For upcoming integer numerals [28, 29, 38, 39, ..., 88, 89] the additive form in the language had been much more common, however, for the listed numbers, the above form was still preferred. Hence, approaching thirty, numerals were expressed as:

- 28 = duodētrīgintā ("two taken from thirty"), less frequently also yet vīgintī octō / octō et vīgintī ("twenty eight / eight and twenty"), (IIXXX or XXIIX versus XXVIII, latter having been fully outcompeted.)
- 29 = ūndētrīgintā ("one taken from thirty") despite the less preferred form was also at their disposal.

This is one of the main foundations of contemporary historians' reasoning, explaining why the subtractive I- and II- was so common in this range of cardinals compared to other ranges. Numerals 98 and 99 could also be expressed in both forms, yet "two to hundred" might have sounded a bit odd –clear evidence of this is the scarce occurrence of these numbers written in such a fashion in authentic sources.

=== Finnish Language ===
There is yet another language having this feature (by now, only in traces), however, still in active use today. This is the Finnish Language, where the (spelled out) numerals are used this way should a digit of 8 or 9 occur. The scheme is like this:

- 1 = "yksi" (Note: yhd- or yht- mostly when about to be declined; e.g. "yhdessä" = "together, as one [entity]")
- 2 = "kaksi" (Also note: kahde-, kahte- when declined)
- 3 = "kolme"
- 4 = "neljä"

...

- 7 = "seitsemän"
- 8 = "kah(d)eksan" (two left [for it to reach it])
- 9 = "yh(d)eksän" (one left [for it to reach it])
- 10 = "kymmenen" (ten)

Above list is no special case, it consequently appears in larger cardinals as well, e.g.:

- 399 = "kolmesataayhdeksänkymmentäyhdeksän"

Emphasizing of these attributes stay present even in the shortest colloquial forms of numerals:

- 1 = "yy"
- 2 = "kaa"
- 3 = "koo"

...

- 7 = "seiska"
- 8 = "kasi"
- 9 = "ysi"
- 10 = "kymppi"

This phenomenon has no influence on written numerals, however; the Finnish use the standard Western-Arabic decimal notation.

=== Time keeping ===
In the English language it is common to refer to a time as, for example, "seven to three" (2:53, seven minutes before 3:00) in which 'to' performs the subtraction.

== Other systems ==
There exist other signed-digit bases such that the base $b \neq b_{+} + b_{-} + 1$. A notable examples of this is Booth encoding, which has a digit set $\mathcal{D} = \lbrace\bar{1},0,1\rbrace$ with $b_{+} = 1$ and $b_{-} = 1$, but which uses a base $b = 2 < 3 = b_{+} + b_{-} + 1$. The standard binary numeral system would only use digits of value $\lbrace0,1\rbrace$.

Note that non-standard signed-digit representations are not unique. For instance:

$$0111_{\mathcal{D}} = 4 + 2 + 1 = 7$$
$$10\bar{1}1_{\mathcal{D}} = 8 - 2 + 1 = 7$$
$$1\bar{1}11_{\mathcal{D}} = 8 - 4 + 2 + 1 = 7$$
$$100\bar{1}_{\mathcal{D}} = 8 - 1 = 7$$

The non-adjacent form (NAF) of Booth encoding does guarantee a unique representation for every integer value. However, this only applies for integer values. For example, consider the following repeating binary numbers in NAF,

$$\frac{2}{3} = 0.\overline{10}_{\mathcal{D}} = 1.\overline{0\bar{1}}_{\mathcal{D}}$$

== See also ==
- Balanced ternary
- Negative base
- Redundant binary representation

== Notes and references ==
- J. P. Balantine (1925) "A Digit for Negative One", American Mathematical Monthly 32:302.
- Lui Han, Dongdong Chen, Seok-Bum Ko, Khan A. Wahid "Non-speculative Decimal Signed Digit Adder" from Department of Electrical and Computer Engineering, University of Saskatchewan.
