= Second Conference on the Epistemology of the Exact Sciences =

Scientific conference in Königsberg (1930)

The second Conference on the Epistemology of the Exact Sciences (German: 2. Tagung für Erkenntnislehre der exakten Wissenschaften in Königsberg) was held on 5–7 September 1930 in Königsberg, then located in East Prussia. It was at this conference that Kurt Gödel first presented his incompleteness theorems, though just "in an off-hand remark during a general discussion on the last day". The real first presentation took place in Vienna.

The conference was organised by Kurt Reidemeister of the University of Königsberg. The presentations were grouped around two themes: firstly, the foundation of mathematics and secondly philosophical questions arising from quantum mechanics. The conference was closely related to the journal Erkenntnis which published the associated papers and accounts of the discussion in Erkenntnis (1931), 2 pp 87-190.

== Foundation of mathematics ==
The presentations as regards the foundation of mathematics were as follows:

Session 1:

- Rudolf Carnap (Vienna), presented the thought of the logicist school as developed by Bertrand Russell
- Arend Heyting (Enschede), presented the thought of the intuitionist school as developed by L. E. J. Brouwer
- John von Neumann (Berlin), presented the thought of the formalist school as developed by David Hilbert
- Friedrich Waismann (Vienna), presented the thought of the linguistic school as developed by Ludwig Wittgenstein
- Kurt Gödel (Vienna), "On the Completeness of the Logical Calculus"
- Arnold Scholz (Freiburg), "On the Use of the Term Holism in Axiomatics"

Session 2:

- Otto Neugebauer (Göttingen), "On Pre-Greek Mathematics"

Session 3:

Discussion on the foundation of mathematics involving Hans Hahn, Carnap, Heyting, von Neumann, Gödel, Scholz and Reidemeister

== Philosophical questions arising from quantum mechanics ==
There were two key presentations.

Session 4:

- Hans Reichenbach (Berlin), presented on the supersession of two-value logic by probability logic
- Werner Heisenberg (Leipzig), presented on the meaninglessness of strict assertions about natural phenomena at the micro level.

Session 5: Discussion on Causality and Quantum Mechanics involving Gerhard Herzberg, Heisenberg, Phillip Frank, Maria Goeppert Mayer, Georg Steinhausen, Georg Hamel, von Neumann, Kurt Grelling, Reichenbach.

== See also ==
- Second Davos Hochschulkurs
