= Scholz's reciprocity law =

Reciprocity law for quadratic residue symbols of real quadratic number fields

In mathematics, Scholz's reciprocity law is a reciprocity law for quadratic residue symbols of real quadratic number fields discovered by Theodor Schönemann (1839) and rediscovered by Arnold Scholz (1929).

== Statement ==
Suppose that p and q are rational primes congruent to 1 mod 4 such that the Legendre symbol (p/q) is 1. Then the ideal (p) factorizes in the ring of integers of Q(√q) as (p)=𝖕𝖕' and similarly (q)=𝖖𝖖' in the ring of integers of Q(√p). Write ε_{p} and ε_{q} for the fundamental units in these quadratic fields. Then Scholz's reciprocity law says that

[ε_{p}/𝖖] = [ε_{q}/𝖕]

where [] is the quadratic residue symbol in a quadratic number field.
