= Luigi Dadda =

Italian computer engineer (1923–2012)

- Born: April 29, 1923; Lodi, Italy
- Died: October 26, 2012 (aged 89); Milan, Italy
- Education: Politecnico di Milano
- Occupation: Computer engineer

Luigi Dadda (April 29, 1923 – October 26, 2012) was an Italian computer engineer, best known for the design of the Dadda multiplier and as one of the first researchers on modern computers in Italy. He was rector at the Politecnico di Milano technical university from 1972 to 1984, collaborating on research at the same university until 2012. He was a Life Fellow of the IEEE.

== Life and work ==
Dadda studied electrical engineering at the Politecnico di Milano and graduated in 1947 with a thesis on signal transmission, a microwave radio bridge between the cities of Turin and Trieste.

His research interests then turned to models and analog computers as an assistant professor, and in 1953 he received a grant from the National Science Foundation in order to study at the California Institute of Technology in Pasadena. In the interim, the Politecnico di Milano requested funding for a digital computer under the Marshall Plan; the request was granted in the sum of US$120,000, and the rector of the time, Prof. Cassinis, invited him to join the design team at the Computer Research Corporation of San Diego, since the machine, a Computer Research Company model CRC 102A, would not be maintained by the vendor after delivery to Italy, and it therefore needed to have in-house expertise on it. Dadda complied, thus forfeiting the NSF grant and transferring to San Diego.

He would travel to Italy on an old Liberty merchant ship along with the precious machine, packed in cotton balls in order to protect its valves from dangerous vibrations. Upon disembarkation in Genoa, the machine was declared with customs as an "electrical appliance", as the only computer machine in the taxonomy of goods used at the time was a "punchcard machine", but a punched card reader was not supplied with the computer, so it didn't fit the categorisation. An additional problem was that, at the time, Italy's taxation imposed the application of a small paper slip similar to a stamp (proving payment of duties) on each and every valve used in the machine. Since dismantling the machine to apply the slips was out of question, the customs allowed Dadda to pay the tax as a forfeit and gave him a pack of slips to apply on the machine "as soon as possible". Those slips remained in a drawer in Dadda's desk.

The machine reached, at last, the Politecnico di Milano in September 1954, where it was activated in the 2SUD back room, and became the first working digital computer in Italy and continental Europe. In the following years, the research activity of Dadda focused on the use of the machine for scientific and industrial applications, and training researchers and students of the Politecnico in Computer Science, where he created and taught the first courses on the subject. Notably, he studied how to enhance the ALUs of the machines, proposing solutions such as the Dadda multiplier, which significantly enhanced performance of those circuits.

He reached the status of a full professor at the Politecnico in 1960 and was assigned the Electrical Engineering chair from 1962. He then moved to studying Petri net as a paradigm for the design of complex control systems. In signal processing he proposed new systems for convolution. He has served as the director of the Computing Center and then of the Computer Architectures Lab of the "Dipartimento di Elettronica ed Informazione" of the Politecnico di Milano university.

He was a founding member of the Italian Association for Computing in 1961 (and President between 1967 and 1970) and a co-founder and director of the distinguished Italian journal of computer science: Rivista di Informatica. He was the proposer of the European Information Network, realized by CEE under the project COST 11. Between 1980 and 1982 he chaired the committee for science and technology of the President of the Council of Ministers of Italy. He served as the president of the ALARI Institute at the Università della Svizzera Italiana in the Italian-speaking canton of Switzerland for over a decade. He was member of the Technical Committee and advisor in the Board of directors of CSELT.

He died on October 26, 2012 in Milan, at the age of 89.

In 2016, the prestigious "IEEE Milestone award" has been assigned to his memory in recognition of his contributions.
