= Arnold Scholz =

German mathematician

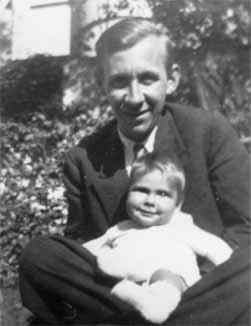
Photo showing Arnold Scholz

Arnold Scholz (24 December 1904 in Berlin – 1 February 1942 in Flensburg) was a German mathematician working in algebraic number theory who proved Scholz's reciprocity law and introduced the Scholz conjecture.

== Biography ==
=== Life ===
Scholz was the son of Reinhold Scholz, an executive at the Prussian Military Research Office. He attended the Kaiserin Auguste Gymnasium in Charlottenburg. From 1923 to 1928, he studied Mathematics, Philosophy and Musicology at the Universität Berlin. In 1928, Scholz wrote his dissertation, supervised by Issai Schur and titled Über die Bildung algebraischer Zahlkörper mit auflösbarer Galoisscher Gruppe ("On the creation of algebraic number fields with solvable Galois Groups").

In 1927, Scholz spent a semester in Vienna, where he studied under Philipp Furtwängler. After his promotion, he became a lecture assistant in Berlin in 1928, a Privatdozent in Freiburg im Breisgau in 1930, and a lecturer at the University of Kiel from 1935-1940. In 1940, he was conscripted and became a lecturer at the Mürwik Naval School in Flensburg-Mürwik.

Throughout his life, he exchanged many letters with Helmut Hasse, and in the 1930s he worked with Olga Taussky-Todd.

In 1942, Scholz died of Diabetes.

=== Work ===
Scholz worked in algebraic number theory. He published early works on the inverse Galois problem in algebraic number fields, where, together with Hans Reichardt, he proved the solvability of the problem for p-groups in the case where p is an odd prime. After the end of World War II, the works of Reichardt and Scholz were carried on by Igor Shafarevich, who showed that the problem is solvable for all solvable groups.

In 1928, Scholz proved the existence of algebraic number fields with arbitrarily large class field towers.

In 1930, Scholz participated in the Second Conference on the Epistemology of the Exact Sciences contributing the paper "On the Use of the Term Holism in Axiomatics" to the discussion on the foundation of mathematics.

Scholz's reciprocity law is named after him, although according to historian of mathematics Franz Lemmermeyer, the law was already known to Theodor Schönemann.

His Nachlass included an almost complete manuscript titled Spezielle Zahlkörper (Special Number Fields), intended for the newest edition of the Encyclopedia of Mathematical Sciences.

== Publications ==
- Scholz, Arnold (1939), Schoeneberg, Bruno (ed.), Einführung in die Zahlentheorie, Sammlung Göschen, vol. 1131, Berlin: Walter de Gruyter & Co., ISBN 978-3-11-129619-7, MR 0031494
