= Theodor Schönemann =

German mathematician

Theodor Schönemann, also written Schoenemann (4 April 1812 – 16 January 1868), was a German mathematician who obtained several important results in number theory concerning the theory of congruences, which can be found in several publications in Crelle's journal, volumes 17 to 40. Notably, he obtained Hensel's lemma before Hensel, Scholz's reciprocity law before Scholz, and formulated Eisenstein's criterion before Eisenstein. He also studied, under the form of integer polynomials modulo both a prime number and an irreducible polynomial (remaining irreducible modulo that prime number), what can nowadays be recognized as finite fields (more general than those of prime order).

He was educated in Königsberg and Berlin, where among his teachers were Jakob Steiner and Carl Gustav Jacob Jacobi. He obtained his doctorate in 1842, after which he became Gymnasialoberlehrer (professor at a gymnasium) in Brandenburg an der Havel. Apart from the mentioned mathematical papers, he also published, mainly after 1850, in mechanics and physical technique.

== Works ==
- Ueber die Bewegung veränderlicher ebener Figuren, welche während der Bewegung sich ähnlich bleiben in ihrer Ebene. 1862 digital
