= Adder–subtractor =

Computing circuit

In digital circuits, an adder–subtractor is a circuit that is capable of adding or subtracting numbers (in particular, binary). Below is a circuit that adds or subtracts depending on a control signal. It is also possible to construct a circuit that performs both addition and subtraction at the same time.

== Construction ==
A 4-bit ripple-carry adder–subtractor based on a 4-bit adder that performs two's complement on A when D = 1 to yield S = B − A.

Having an n-bit adder for A and B, then S = A + B. Then, assume the numbers are in two's complement. Then to perform B − A, two's complement theory says to invert each bit of A with a NOT gate then add one. This yields S = B + A̅ + 1, which is easy to do with a slightly modified adder.

By preceding each A input bit on the adder with a 2-to-1 multiplexer where:

- Input 0 (I_{0}) is A
- Input 1 (I_{1}) is A̅

that has control input D that is also connected to the initial carry, then the modified adder performs

- addition when D = 0, or
- subtraction when D = 1.

This works because when D = 1 the A input to the adder is really A̅ and the carry in is 1. Adding B to A̅ and 1 yields the desired subtraction of B − A.

A way you can mark number A as positive or negative without using a multiplexer on each bit is to use an XOR gate to precede each bit instead.

- The first input to the XOR gate is the actual input bit
- The second input for each XOR gate is the control input D

This produces the same truth table for the bit arriving at the adder as the multiplexer solution does since the XOR gate output will be what the input bit is when D = 0 and the inverted input bit when D = 1.

== Role in the arithmetic logic unit ==
Adders are a part of the core of an arithmetic logic unit (ALU). The control unit decides which operations an ALU should perform (based on the op code being executed) and sets the ALU operation. The D input to the adder–subtractor above would be one such control line from the control unit.

The adder–subtractor above could easily be extended to include more functions. For example, a 2-to-1 multiplexer could be introduced on each B_{i} that would switch between zero and B_{i}; this could be used (in conjunction with D = 1) to yield the two's complement of A since −A = A̅ + 1.

A further step would be to change the 2-to-1 multiplex on A to a 4-to-1 with the third input being zero, then replicating this on B_{i} thus yielding the following output functions:

- 0 (with both the A_{i} and B_{i} inputs set to zero and D = 0)
- 1 (with both the A_{i} and B_{i} inputs set to zero and D = 1)
- A (with the B_{i} input set to zero)
- B (with the A_{i} input set to zero)
- A + 1 (with the B_{i} input set to zero and D = 1)
- B + 1 (with the A_{i} input set to zero and D = 1)
- A + B
- A − B
- B − A
- A̅ (with A_{i} set to invert; B_{i} set to zero; and D = 0)
- −A (with A_{i} set to invert; B_{i} set to zero; and D = 1)
- B̅ (with B_{i} set to invert; A_{i} set to zero; and D = 0)
- −B (with B_{i} set to invert; A_{i} set to zero; and D = 1)

By adding more logic in front of the adder, a single adder can be converted into much more than just an adder—an ALU.

== See also ==
- Adder (electronics)
- Carry-lookahead adder
- Carry-save adder
- Adding machine
- Subtractor
