= BKA =

BKA or B.K.A. may refer to:

== Places ==
- Bara Khyber Agency, a town in Bara Tehsil, Khyber Agency, FATA, Pakistan
- Bykovo Airport (IATA: BKA), near Moscow, Russia

== Organizations ==
- Byelorussian Auto Moto Touring Club, a member of the Fédération Internationale de l'Automobile (FIA)
- Byelorussian Home Defence (Belarusian: Biełaruskaja Krajovaja Abarona), battalions who fought alongside the SS during World War II
- British Kendo Association, a non-profit organisation supporting kendo, iaido, and jodo
- Federal Criminal Police Office (Germany) (German: Bundeskriminalamt)
  - BKA ASE, a specialized unit within the German Federal Criminal Police
- Federal Chancellery of Austria (German: Bundeskanzleramt)

== Other uses ==
- Below-knee amputation
- Betsy's Kindergarten Adventures, a children's television show on PBS
- Brent–Kung adder, a type of digital logic circuit
- BelKA, Belarusian remote sensing satellite
