= Boston University College of Engineering =

Engineering school of Boston University

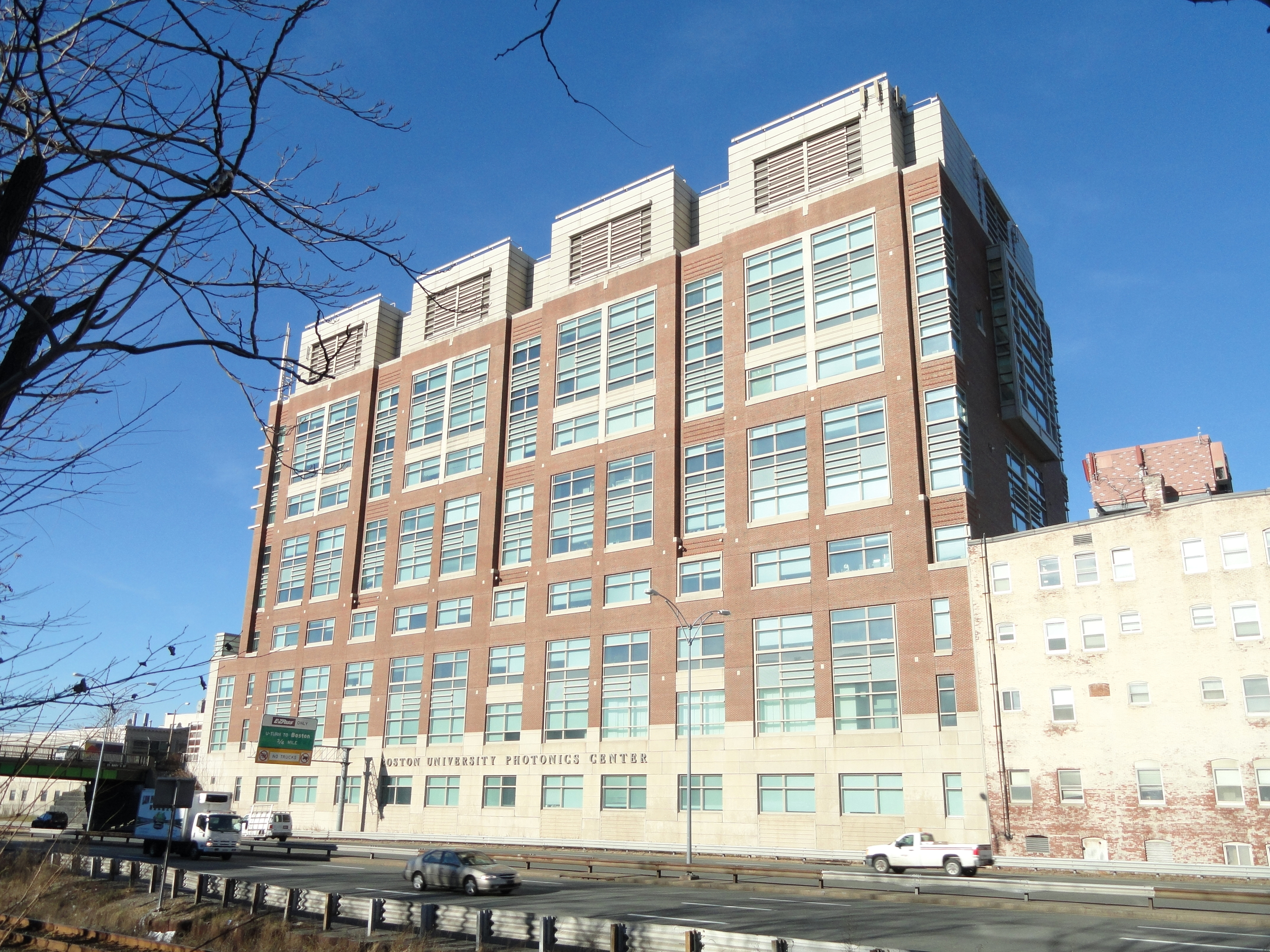
- Photonics Center
- Type: Private
- Established: 1950
- Parent institution: Boston University
- Academic affiliations: Space-grant
- Dean: Elise Morgan
- Faculty: 163
- Students: 2,711
- Undergraduates: 1,746
- Postgraduates: 965
- Location: Boston, Massachusetts, United States; 42.3485491°N 71.10297°W
- Campus: Urban
- Website: bu.edu/eng

The Boston University College of Engineering (ENG) is the engineering school of Boston University. Founded in 1950, it originally started as the New England Aircraft School and was later renamed the College of Engineering in 1963. The college offers both undergraduate and graduate degrees in various engineering disciplines, with a wide range of concentrations available.

== Academics ==
Every undergraduate student enrolled in the College of Engineering is a Boston University Bachelor of Science degree candidate who upon completion of the four-year program will be awarded. In order to graduate, students must complete all of the degree requirements while maintaining a cumulative GPA of at least 2.00. Alongside credit requirements, students must also satisfy either the Hub or General Education requirements and the Math, Natural Science and Residency requirements.
Top 30% of the full-time students from each class year are placed on the Dean’s List of academic honor each semester.

== Areas of Study ==
Undergraduate:
The Boston University College of Engineering offers the following degrees at the undergraduate level:

- Biomedical Engineering
- Computer Engineering
- Electrical Engineering
- Mechanical Engineering

Graduate:
The Boston University College of Engineering offers the following degrees at the graduate program:

- Biomedical Engineering
- Electrical and Computer Engineering
- Mechanical Engineering
- Materials Science & Engineering
- Systems Engineering
- Robotics and Autonomous Systems

Concentrations:
The Boston University College of Engineering offers the following concentrations:

- Aerospace Engineering
- Energy Technologies and Sustainability
- Machine Learning
- Manufacturing Engineering
- Nanotechnology
- Technology Innovation

== Distinguished Alumni ==
- Tye Brady:
  - Tye Brady, chief technologist of Amazon Robotics, obtained a bachelor of science in aerospace engineering from the Boston University College of Engineering in 1990. After completing his studies, Brady spent nearly two decades in spacecraft engineering. Furthermore, he is the founding partner of MassRobotics, a nonprofit innovation center supporting robotics initiatives.
- Andres Jaramillo-Botero:
  - Jaramillo-Botero, a Colombian-American scientist and professor, earned his Bachelor of Science degree in Electrical Engineering from the Boston University College of Engineering. He is a research Scientist at Caltech’s Chemistry and Chemical Engineering division.
- Manuel O. Méndez:
  - Manuel O. Méndez, Chief Executive Officer at Quotient Ltd, received a bachelor’s degree in biomedical engineering from the Boston University College of Engineering. Currently he is working as the Chief Executive Officer at Quotient and serves on the Advisory Boards of the College of Engineering, Forbes Business Counsel and more.
- Louvere Walker Hannon:
  - Hannon, a MathWorks Application Engineering Senior Team Lead, holds A Bachelor of Science degree in biomedical engineering from Boston University College of Engineering. Louvere had significant impact in 3 different engineering roles throughout her career at MathWorks. She presents at STEM-related conferences and has received many awards in her field.

== First Destination Activity, Post Undergraduate ==
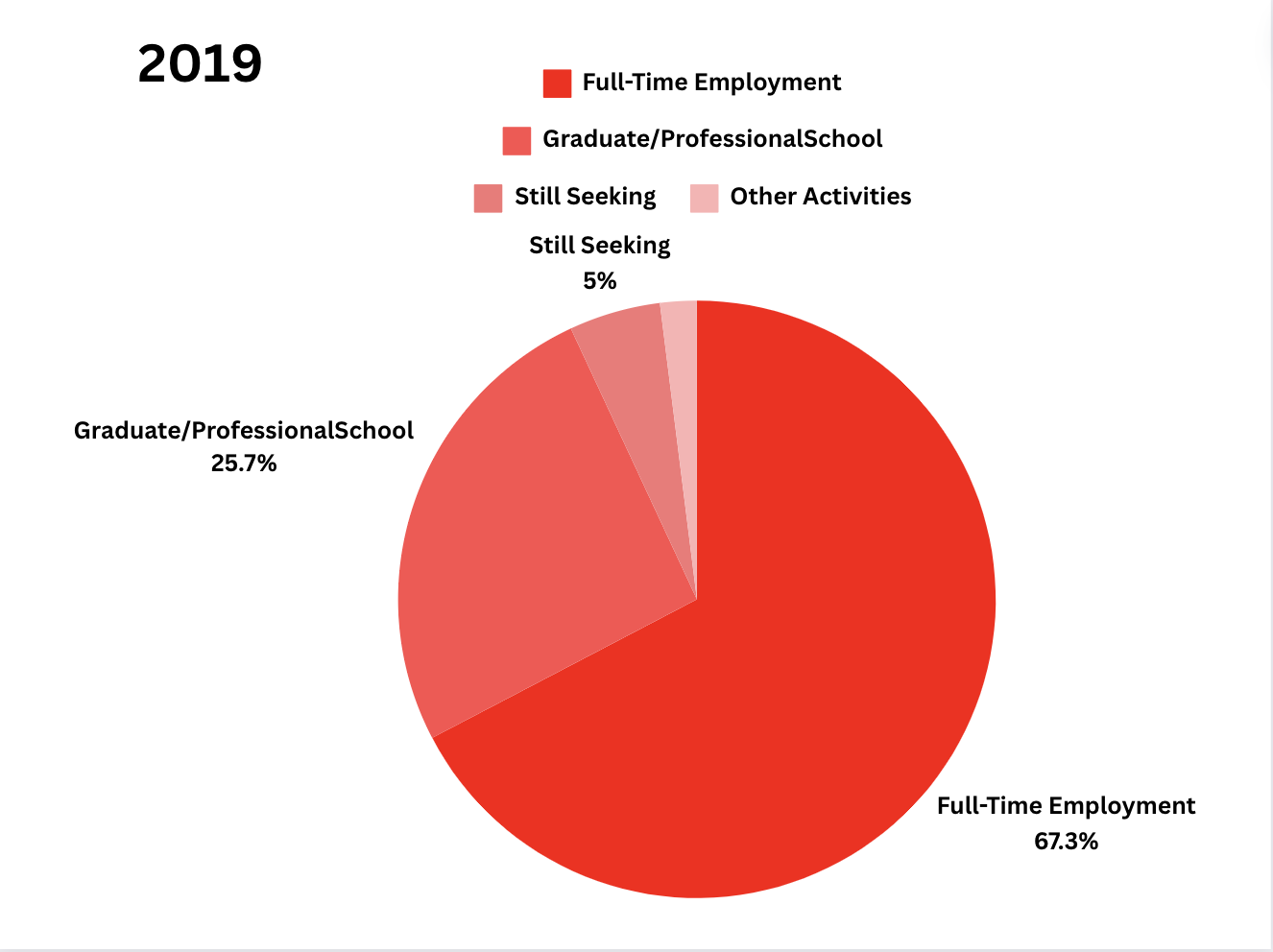

For the 2019 first destination activity of Boston University College of Engineering graduates, the data showed that 68% secured full-time employment, 26% continued their education in graduate or professional school, 5% were still seeking employment, and 2% engaged in other activities such as part-time employment, military service, or taking a gap year.

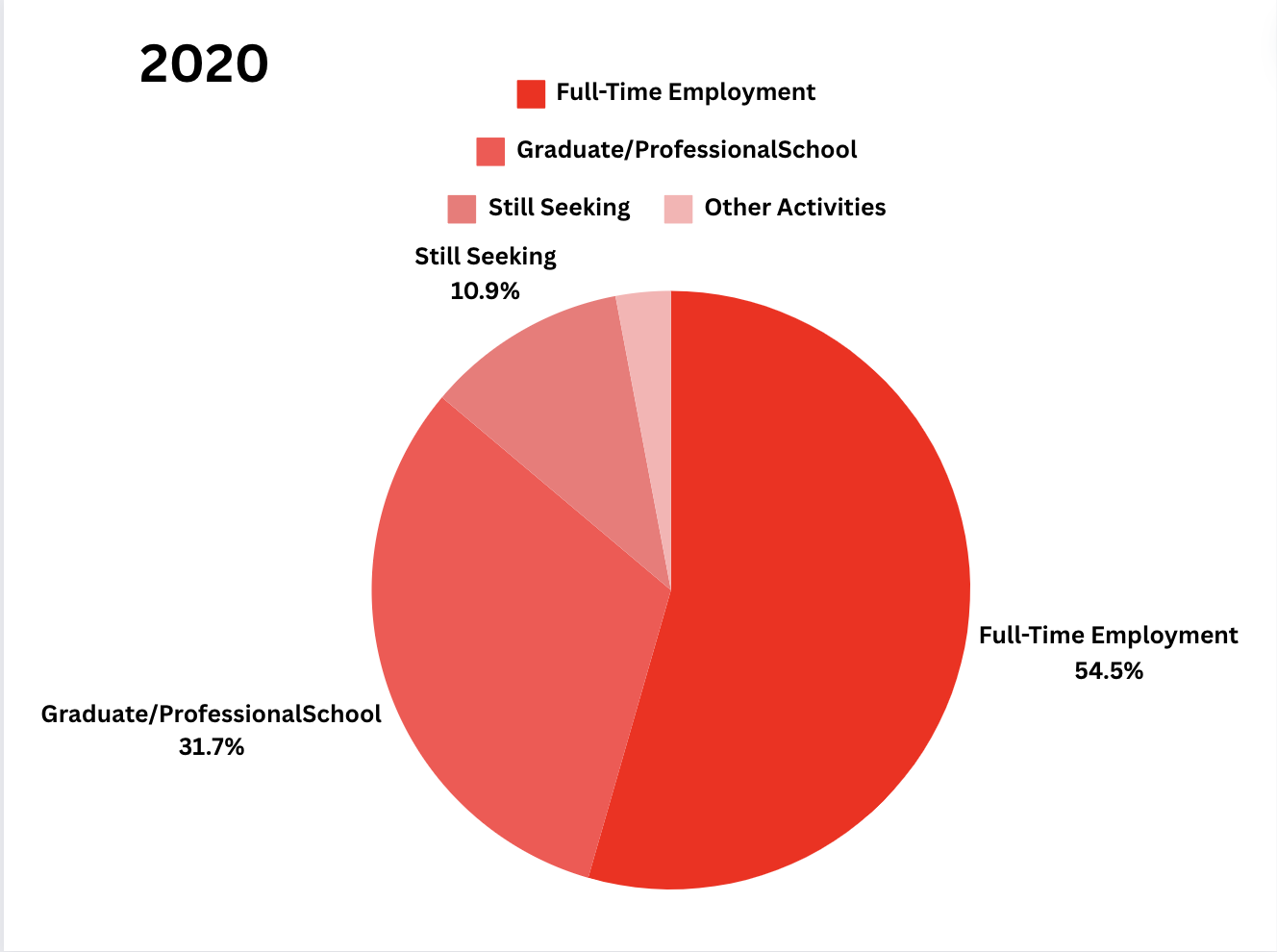

For the 2020 first destination activity, 55% of the graduates were employed full-time, a higher percentage of 32% pursued further education in graduate or professional programs, 11% were still seeking employment, and 3% were involved in other activities, which included part-time work, military service, or taking time off.

== Average Starting Salaries ==
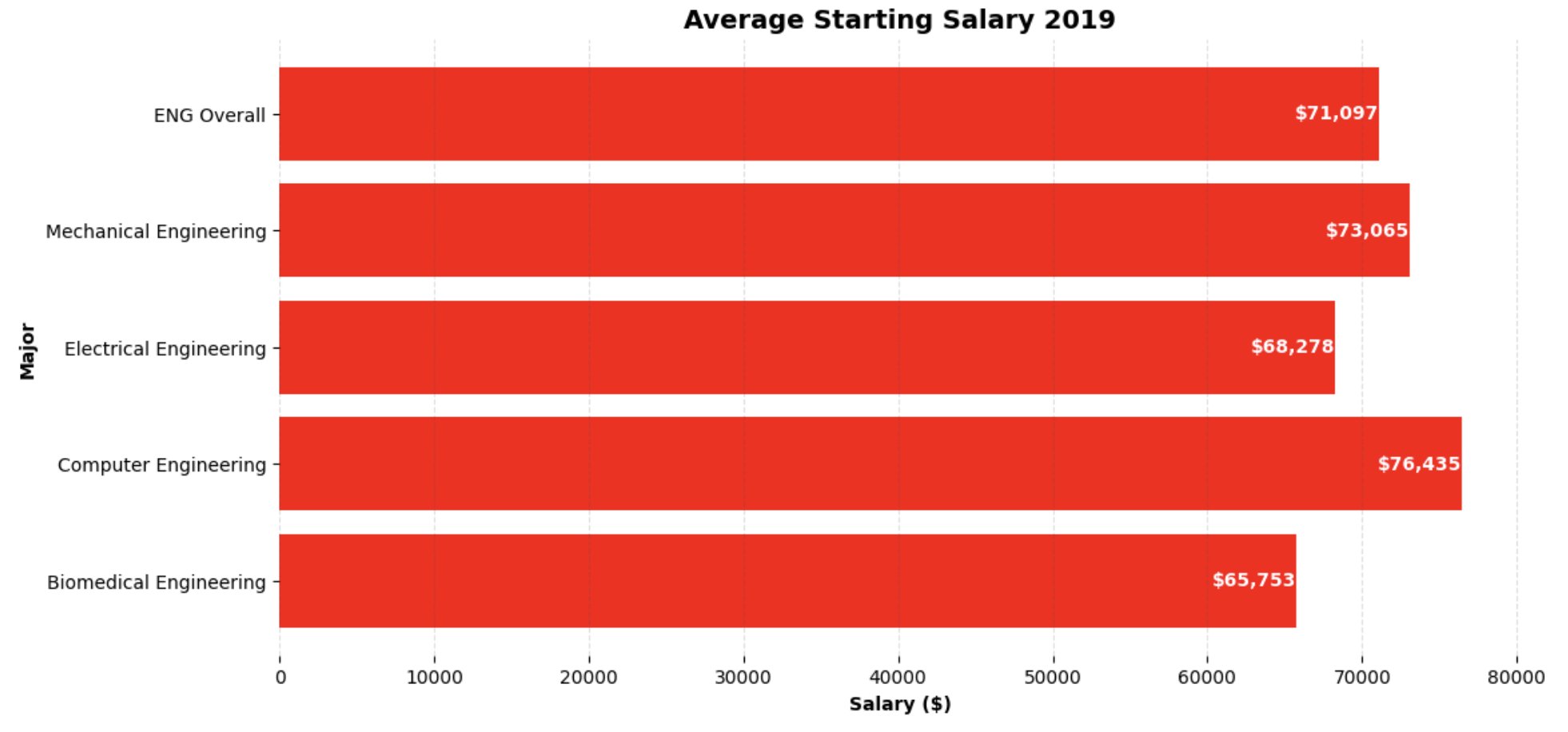

In 2019, the average starting salary statistics for Boston University College of Engineering graduates were as follows: Computer Engineering majors earned an average of $76,435, Electrical Engineering majors earned $68,278, Mechanical Engineering majors earned $73,065, and Biomedical Engineering majors earned $65,753. The average starting salary for all engineering graduates was $71,097.

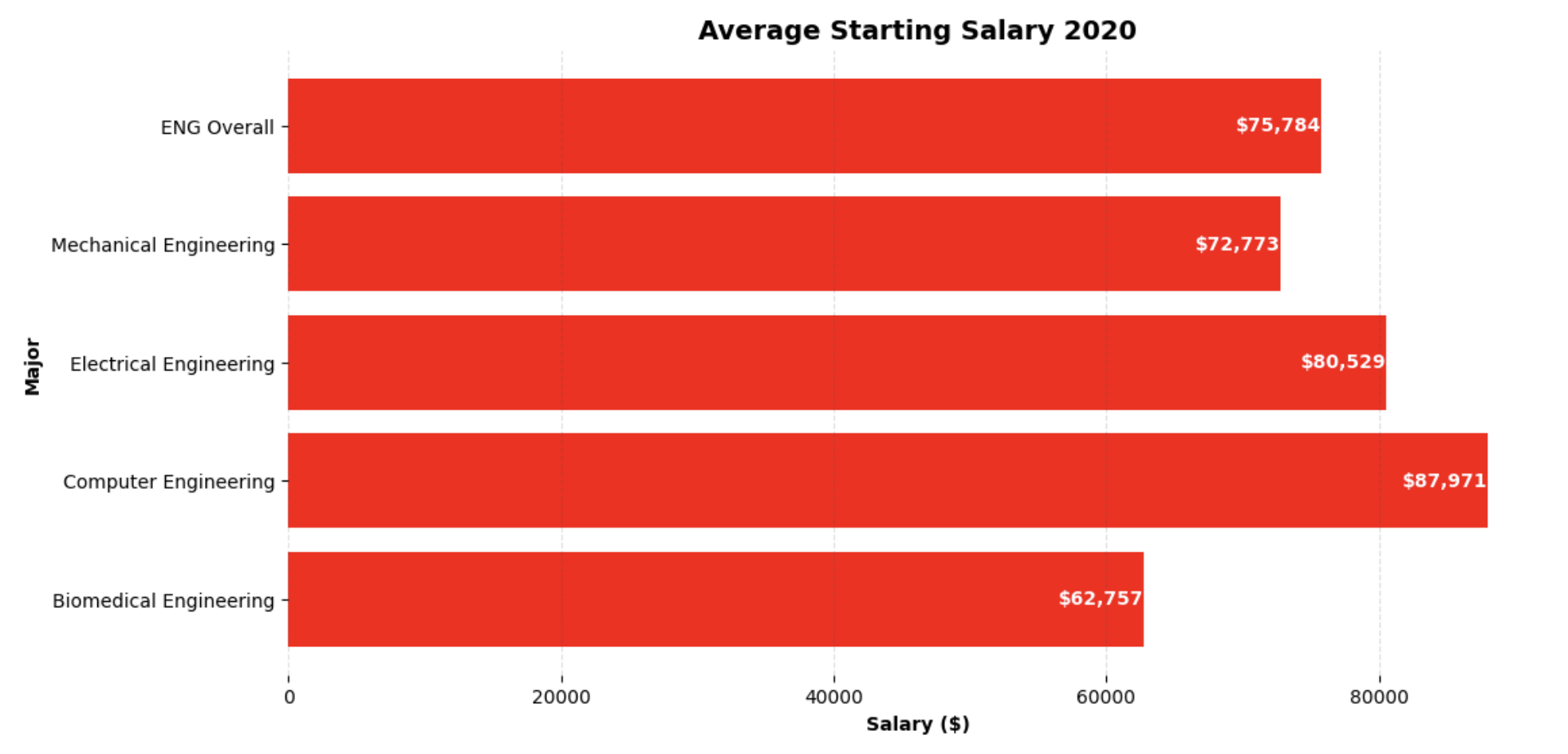

In 2020, the average starting salary statistics for Boston University College of Engineering graduates were as follows: Computer Engineering majors earned an average of $87,971, Electrical Engineering majors earned $80,529, Mechanical Engineering majors earned $72,773, and Biomedical Engineering majors earned $62,757. The average starting salary for all engineering graduates was $75,784.
