= LCU =

LCU may refer to:

- A US Navy hull classification symbol: Landing craft utility (LCU)
- Largest coding unit, the basic processing unit of the High Efficiency Video Coding (HEVC) video standard
- Last Chance U, a documentary series
- Lego City Undercover, a video game
- Limited Contact Unit, a class of fictional artificially intelligent starship in The Culture universe of late Scottish author Iain Banks
- Lokesh Cinematic Universe, a shared universe of action thriller films created by Lokesh Kanagaraj
- Local colleges and universities in the Philippines
- Local currency unit
- Lookahead Carry Unit
- Lubbock Christian University
