= Andres Jaramillo-Botero =

American scientist (born 1964)

- Born: 1964 (age 61–62); Cali, Colombia
- Education: Boston University; State University of New York; Polytechnic University of Valencia
- Known for: Nanotechnology; Molecular modeling Robotics
- Spouse: Maria Claudia Ojeda
- Scientific career
- Fields: Nanotechnology; Computational Chemistry; Physical Chemistry; Electrical Engineering
- Workplaces: California Institute of Technology; Pontifical Xavierian University
- Doctoral advisor: Alfons Crespo; William A. Goddard III

Andres Jaramillo-Botero (born March 28, 1964) is a Colombian-American scientist and professor, working in nanoscale chemical physics, known for his contributions to first-principles based modeling, design, synthesis and characterization of nanostructured materials and devices.

== Education and training ==
Jaramillo-Botero earned a B.S. in electrical engineering from Boston University in 1986, an M.Sc. in computer science from the State University of New York as a Fulbright scholar in 1989, under the supervision of Kanad Ghose and Peter Kogge, and a Doctorate degree in engineering from the Polytechnic University of Valencia (UPV) in 1998 (Valencia, Spain), under the supervision of Alfons Crespo (at UPV) and co-supervision of William A. Goddard III (at Caltech). His doctoral work, developed while at the California Institute of Technology and NASA's Jet Propulsion Laboratory, during 1996–1997, contributed time-lower bound solution and algorithms to the n-body dynamics problem and their application at multiple length scales, from molecular to macroscopic systems.

== Career ==
Jaramillo-Botero began his academic career as an assistant professor in engineering and applied sciences at the Pontifical Xavierian University in 1990, where he reached full professorship by 1999. Since his early days at this institution, he served in various positions such as Member of the university's board of directors, Engineering Faculty Dean, founding Director of the Doctoral program in Engineering and Applied Sciences, founding Director of the electronics engineering undergraduate program, and Director of the computer science undergraduate program. In 2001, Jaramillo-Botero was received into the Xavierian honor society for his contributions to science and academia in Colombia.

He joined the California Institute of Technology (Caltech) full-time in 2006, and relocated to the US as an Alien of extraordinary ability recipient (EB-1A category). At Caltech, he holds key positions as a Scientist-Lecturer in the Chemistry and Chemical Engineering division, and as the Director of Nanotechnology and Multiscale Science in the Materials and Process Simulation Center. He remains a distinguished professor in engineering and science and a member of the Board of Regents at the Pontifical Xavierian University in Colombia.

== Research Work ==
Jaramillo-Botero developed an early interest for multibody dynamics control as a research scholar in Advanced Industrial Applications at the Robotics and Autonomous Machinery division of the Mechanical Engineering Laboratory (1992-1993, National Institute of Advanced Industrial Science and Technology or AIST), where he focused on dynamic real-time visual control of robotic systems. He transitioned from macroscopic to nanoscale multibody dynamics control and modeling during his research appointment with NASA's Jet Propulsion Laboratory and Caltech (1996-1997). He continued to develop fundamental frameworks for designing atomic-scale manipulators with optimized dynamic response during postdoctoral appointments (2002 -2005), as a National Science Foundation (NSF) Fellow in the Nanoscale Science and Engineering program, at UCLA's Institute for Pure and Applied Mathematics (IPAM), and, as an NSF Fellow in Computational Nanotechnology and Molecular Engineering, at Caltech.

Jaramillo-Botero is recognized for his work on the first-principles-based design, characterization, synthesis, and optimization of nanostructured materials and devices, and for his multi-omics approach to study biomolecular mechanisms.

His contributions span multiple fields of study, including: molecular hypervelocity impact phenomena in space missions, dynamics of materials in extreme conditions (non-adiabatic behavior), first-principles based atomistic and coarse-grain force fields and simulation methods to study complex chemical processes, some of which are embedded in widely used open source codes like LAMMPS, low-temperature crystalline thin film growth and characterization, single-molecule sensing and actuation nanodevices, and computational dynamics methods in large-scale multi body systems (from atomistic to continuum).

Jaramillo-Botero led the OMICAS Alliance as Scientific Director, an international, multi-institutional research effort spurred by the Colombian government under the World Bank PACES program to address food security and sustainable productivity, via Omics characterization and optimization of plant organisms. and the creation of the OMICAS Research Institute - iOMICAS at the Pontifical Xavierian University in Cali; a state of the art facility focused on translational research to address overarching challenges associated to health, food security, and productive sustainability.

== Personal life ==
Jaramillo-Botero was raised, along with three siblings, to parents Jorge Jaramillo-Douat and Clara Ines Botero-Saenz. Jaramillo-Botero is married to Maria Claudia Ojeda. They bore two children, Tomas (2004-) and Lucas (2000–2009).

== U.S. Patents ==
He holds multiple US and European patents as of 2016.
