= Carry operator =

Symbol

The carry operator, symbolized by the ¢ sign, is an abstraction of the operation of determining whether a portion of an adder network generates or propagates a carry. It is defined as follows:

$(G_1, P_1) \$ ¢ $(G_2, P_2) = (G_1 \lor G_2 P_1, P_2 P_1)$
