= Peter Kogge =

American computer engineer

- Education: University of Notre Dame (B.Eng); Stanford University (PhD)
- Occupation: Engineer
- Engineering career
- Discipline: Computer Science, Computer Engineering
- Institutions: University of Notre Dame
- Employer(s): IBM

Peter Michael Kogge is an American computer engineer and IBM Fellow.

== Background ==
Kogge has been at the forefront of several innovations that have shaped the computing industry over the past three decades. While working on his PhD at Stanford in the 1970s, Kogge invented what is still today considered the fastest way of adding numbers in a computer, the Kogge–Stone Adder process, an approach still used in microprocessors by Intel and other companies.

After receiving his degree, Kogge joined the computer engineering team at IBM. During his time there, he was a co-inventor on over three dozen patents. His design of the Space Shuttle I/O processor at IBM was one of the first multithreaded computers, and the first to fly in space.

== Contributions ==
Peter was the author of the first textbook on pipelining, a now ubiquitous technique for executing multiple instructions in a computer in parallel. At IBM, Kogge was also the inventor of the world's first multi-core processor, EXECUBE, which Kogge and his team placed on a memory chip in an early effort to solve the data bottleneck problem that Emu is solving today.

In 1994, Kogge joined the University of Notre Dame as a faculty member, the Ted H. McCourtney Professor of Computer Science and Engineering. He received the IEEE Computer Society Charles Babbage Award in 2014.
