= Lookahead carry unit =

Logical unit in digital circuit design

A lookahead carry unit (LCU) is a logical unit in digital circuit design used to decrease calculation time in adder units and used in conjunction with carry look-ahead adders (CLAs).

== 4-bit adder ==
A single 4-bit CLA is shown below:

4-bit adder with Carry Look Ahead (CLA)

== 16-bit adder ==
By combining four 4-bit CLAs, a 16-bit adder can be created but additional logic is needed in the form of an LCU.

The LCU accepts the group propagate ($P_G$) and group generate ($G_G$) from each of the four CLAs. $P_G$ and $G_G$ have the following expressions for each CLA adder:

$$P_G = P_0 \cdot P_1 \cdot P_2 \cdot P_3$$
$$G_G = G_3 + G_2 \cdot P_3 + G_1 \cdot P_2 \cdot P_3 + G_0 \cdot P_1 \cdot P_2 \cdot P_3$$

The LCU then generates the carry input for each CLA.

Assume that $P_i$ is $P_G$ and $G_i$ is $G_G$ from the i^{th} CLA then the output carry bits are

$$C_{4} = G_0 + P_0 \cdot C_0$$
$$C_{8} = G_{4} + P_{4} \cdot C_{4}$$
$$C_{12} = G_{8} + P_{8} \cdot C_{8}$$
$$C_{16} = G_{12} + P_{12} \cdot C_{12}$$

Substituting $C_{4}$ into $C_{8}$, then $C_{8}$ into $C_{12}$, then $C_{12}$ into $C_{16}$ yields the expanded equations:

$$C_{4} = G_0 + P_0 \cdot C_0$$
$$C_{8} = G_4 + G_0 \cdot P_4 + C_0 \cdot P_0 \cdot P_4$$
$$C_{12} = G_8 + G_4 \cdot P_8 + G_0 \cdot P_4 \cdot P_8 + C_0 \cdot P_0 \cdot P_4 \cdot P_8$$
$$C_{16} = G_{12} + G_8 \cdot P_{12} + G_4 \cdot P_8 \cdot P_{12} + G_0 \cdot P_4 \cdot P_8 \cdot P_{12} + C_0 \cdot P_0 \cdot P_4 \cdot P_8 \cdot P_{12}$$

$C_{4}$ corresponds to the carry input into the second CLA; $C_{8}$ to the third CLA; $C_{12}$ to the fourth CLA; and $C_{16}$ to overflow carry bit.

In addition, the LCU can calculate its own propagate and generate:

$$P_{LCU} = P_0 \cdot P_4 \cdot P_8 \cdot P_{12}$$
$$G_{LCU} =  G_{12} + G_8 \cdot P_{12} + G_4 \cdot P_8 \cdot P_{12} + G_0 \cdot P_4 \cdot P_8 \cdot P_{12}$$
$$C_{16} = G_{LCU} + C_0 \cdot P_{LCU}$$

16-bit adder with LCU

== 64-bit adder ==
By combining 4 CLAs and an LCU together creates a 16-bit adder. Four of these units can be combined to form a 64-bit adder. An additional (second-level) LCU is needed that accepts the propagate ($P_{LCU}$) and generate ($G_{LCU}$) from each LCU and the four carry outputs generated by the second-level LCU are fed into the first-level LCUs.

64-bit adders with a second-level LCU
