= Ammonium =

Polyatomic cation

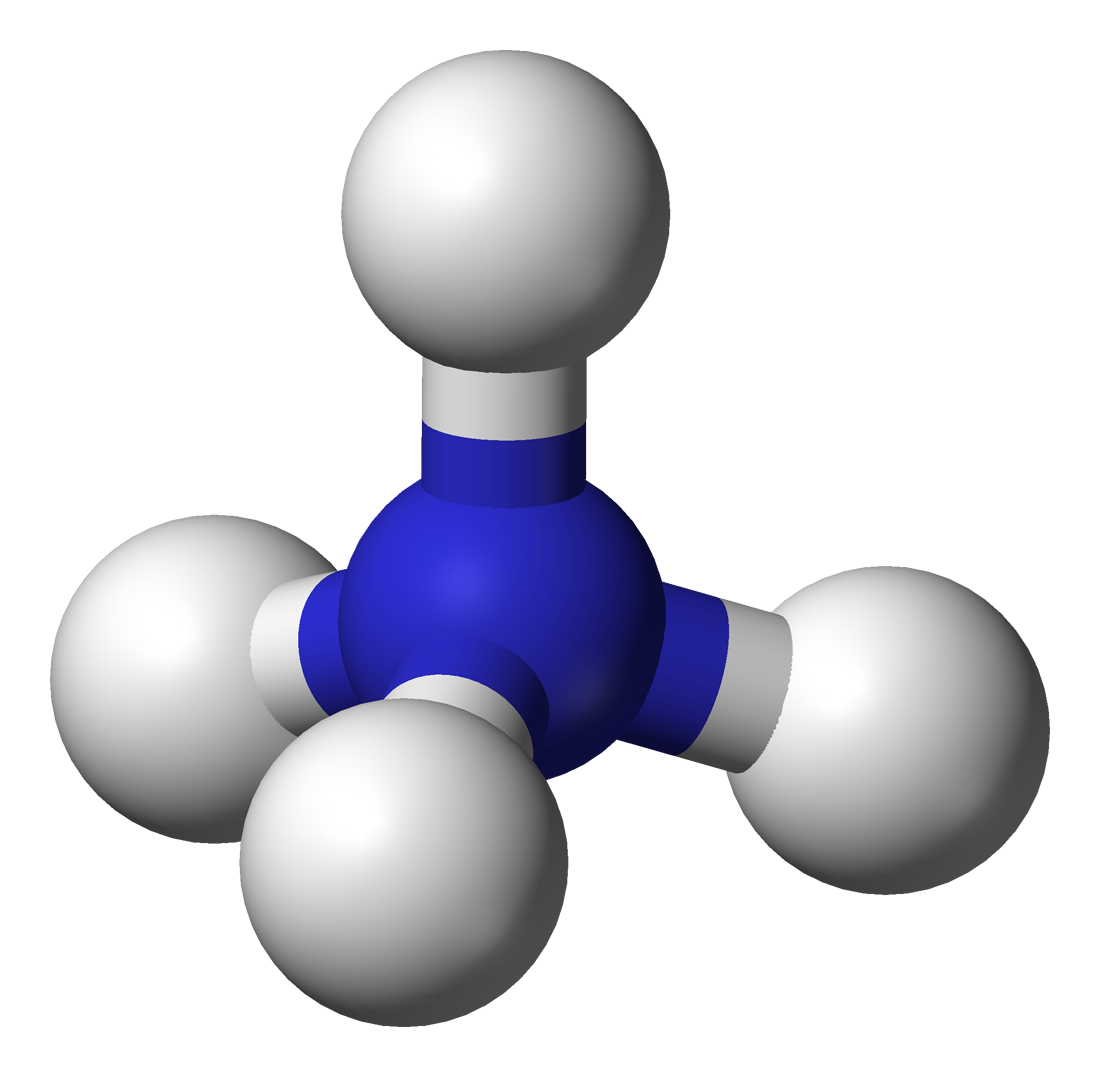

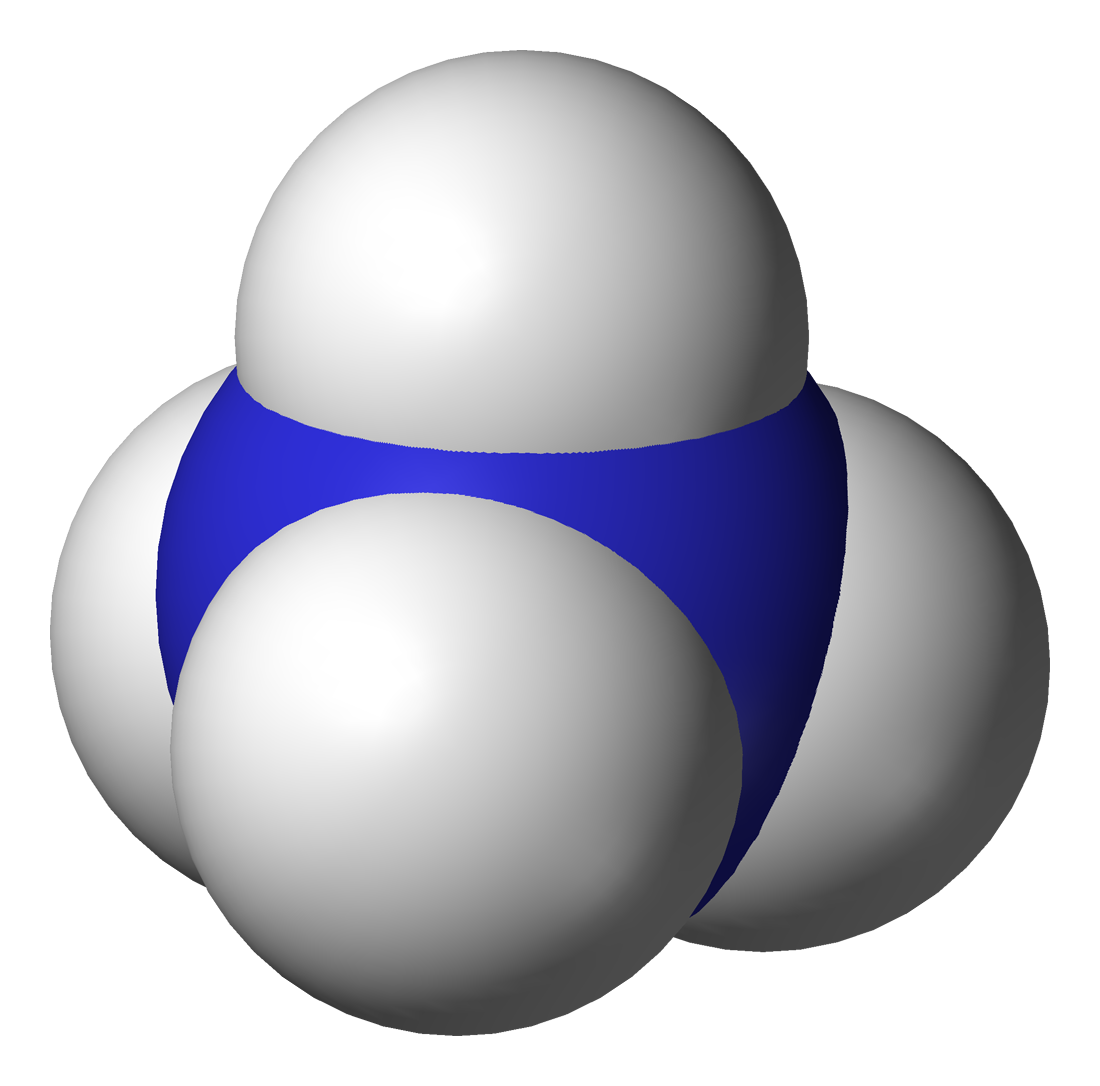

Names
- IUPAC name Ammonium ion
- Systematic IUPAC name Azanium

Identifiers
CAS Number	14798-03-9
3D model (JSmol)	Interactive image
ChEBI	CHEBI:28938
ChemSpider	218
Gmelin Reference	84
KEGG	C01342
MeSH	D000644
PubChem CID	16741146
UNII	54S68520I4
CompTox Dashboard (EPA)	DTXSID5043974
- InChI: InChI=1S/H3N/h1H3/p+1 Key: QGZKDVFQNNGYKY-UHFFFAOYSA-O; InChI=1/H3N/h1H3/p+1 Key: QGZKDVFQNNGYKY-IKLDFBCSAZ
- SMILES: [NH4+]

Properties
Chemical formula	[NH_{4}]^{+}
Molar mass	18.039 g·mol^{−1}
Acidity (pK_{a})	9.25
Conjugate base	Ammonia

Structure
Molecular shape	Tetrahedral

Related compounds
Other cations	Phosphonium [PH_{4}]^{+}; Hydronium [H_{3}O]^{+}
Related compounds	Ammonium radical •NH4
- Except where otherwise noted, data are given for materials in their standard state (at 25 °C [77 °F], 100 kPa). Infobox references

Ammonium is a modified form of ammonia that has an extra hydrogen atom. It is a positively charged (cationic) molecular ion with the chemical formula NH_{4}^{+} or [NH_{4}]^{+}. It is formed by the addition of a proton (a hydrogen nucleus) to ammonia (NH_{3}). Ammonium is also a general name for positively charged (protonated) substituted amines and quaternary ammonium cations ([NR_{4}]^{+}), where one or more hydrogen atoms are replaced by organic or other groups (indicated by R). Not only is ammonium a source of nitrogen and a key metabolite for many living organisms, but it is an integral part of the global nitrogen cycle. As such, human impact in recent years could have an effect on the biological communities that depend on it.

== Acid–base properties ==
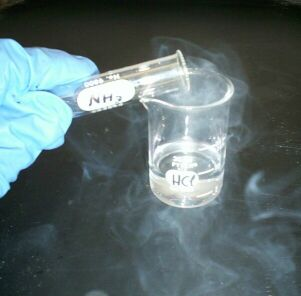
Fumes from hydrochloric acid and ammonia forming a white cloud of ammonium chloride

The ammonium ion is generated when ammonia, a weak base, reacts with Brønsted acids (proton donors):

H^{+} + NH_{3} → [NH_{4}]^{+}

The ammonium ion is mildly acidic, reacting with Brønsted bases to return to the uncharged ammonia molecule:

[NH_{4}]^{+} + B^{−} → HB + NH_{3}

Thus, the treatment of concentrated solutions of ammonium salts with a strong base gives ammonia. When ammonia is dissolved in water, a tiny amount of it converts to ammonium ions:

H_{2}O + NH_{3} ⇌ OH^{−} + [NH_{4}]^{+}

The degree to which ammonia forms the ammonium ion depends on the pH of the solution. If the pH is low, the equilibrium shifts to the right: more ammonia molecules are converted into ammonium ions. If the pH is high (the concentration of hydrogen ions is low and hydroxide ions is high), the equilibrium shifts to the left: the hydroxide ion abstracts a proton from the ammonium ion, generating ammonia.

Formation of ammonium compounds can also occur in the vapor phase; for example, when ammonia vapor comes in contact with hydrogen chloride vapor, a white cloud of ammonium chloride forms, which eventually settles out as a solid in a thin white layer on surfaces.

== Salts and characteristic reactions ==
Formation of ammonium

Ammonium cation is found in several commercially important salts, dominated by ammonium nitrate and ammonium sulfate, which are components of fertilizers. Other ammonium compounds produced on a multi-ton scale are ammonium chloride, ammonium hydrogencarbonate, ammonium carbonate, and ammonium carbamate.

Most simple ammonium salts are very soluble in water. An exception is ammonium hexachloroplatinate, the formation of which was once used as a test for ammonium.

The ammonium salts of nitrate and especially perchlorate are highly explosive, in these cases, ammonium is the reducing agent.

Addition of sodium amalgam to a solution of ammonium chloride gives an ammonium amalgam. This amalgam eventually decomposes to release ammonia and hydrogen.

Ammonium salts react with alkali hydroxide releasing ammonia.

[NH_{4}]^{+} + OH^{−} → NH_{3} + H_{2}O

To further confirm ammonia, it is passed through a glass rod dipped in an HCl solution (hydrochloric acid), creating white dense fumes of ammonium chloride.

NH_{3} + HCl → [NH_{4}]Cl

Ammonia or ammonium ion when added to Nessler's reagent gives a brown color precipitate known as the iodide of Million's base in basic medium.

Ammonium ion when added to chloroplatinic acid gives a yellow precipitate of ammonium hexachloroplatinate(IV).

H_{2}[PtCl_{6}] + [NH_{4}]^{+} → [NH_{4}]_{2}[PtCl_{6}](s) + 2 H^{+}

Ammonium ion when added to sodium cobaltinitrite gives a yellow precipitate of ammonium cobaltinitrite.

Na_{3}[Co(NO_{2})_{6}] + 3 [NH_{4}]^{+} → [NH_{4}]_{3}[Co(NO_{2})_{6}](s) + 3 Na^{+}

Ammonium ion gives a white precipitate of ammonium bitartrate when added to potassium bitartrate.

KC_{4}H_{5}O_{6} + [NH_{4}]^{+} → [NH_{4}]C_{4}H_{5}O_{6}(s) + K^{+}

== Structure and bonding ==
The lone electron pair on the nitrogen atom (N) in ammonia, represented as a line above the N, forms a coordinate bond with a proton (H^{+}). After that, all four N−H bonds are equivalent, being polar covalent bonds. The ion has a tetrahedral structure and is isoelectronic with methane and the borohydride anion. In terms of size, the ammonium cation (r_{ionic} = 148 pm), it is intermediate in size between potassium (144 pm) and rubidium ions (152 pm) when in an octahedral environment.

The vibrational spectrum consists of two main sets of absorptions, ν_{N-H} and δ_{HNH}. These bands are found near 3300 and 1400 cm^{−1}.

== Organic ions ==
The hydrogen atoms in the ammonium ion can be substituted with an alkyl group or some other organic group to form a substituted ammonium ion (IUPAC nomenclature: aminium ion). Depending on the number of organic groups, the ammonium cation is called a primary, secondary, tertiary, or quaternary. Except the quaternary ammonium cations, the organic ammonium cations are weak acids.

An example of a reaction forming an ammonium ion is that between dimethylamine, (CH_{3})_{2}NH, and an acid to give the dimethylammonium cation, [(CH_{3})_{2}NH_{2}]^{+}:

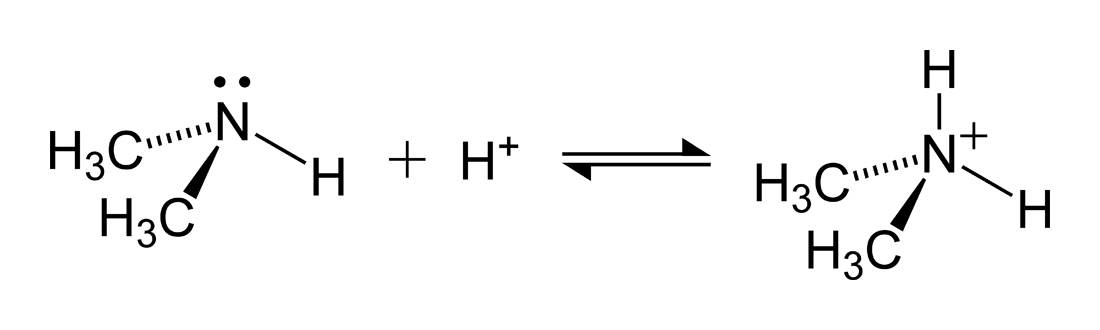

Quaternary ammonium cations have four organic groups attached to the nitrogen atom, they lack a hydrogen atom bonded to the nitrogen atom. These cations, such as the tetra-n-butylammonium cation, are sometimes used to replace sodium or potassium ions to increase the solubility of the associated anion in organic solvents. Primary, secondary, and tertiary ammonium salts serve the same function but are less lipophilic. They are also used as phase-transfer catalysts and surfactants.

An unusual class of organic ammonium salts is derivatives of amine radical cations, [•NR_{3}]^{+} such as tris(4-bromophenyl)ammoniumyl hexachloroantimonate.

== Biology ==
Ammonium exists as a result of ammonification and decomposers. Ammonium is eventually nitrified, where it contributes to the flow of nitrogen through the ecosystem. Human impacts are not shown here, but can impact the global nitrogen cycle.

Ammonium is utilized by living organism for biosynthesis and as an electron donor.

In part related to the use of fertilizers, there is much interest in ammonium in soils.

=== Nitrogen cycle ===
Ammonium is oxidized to first to nitrite and then to nitrate by nitrifying bacteria in a process known as nitrification, a form of chemolithotrophy. Ammonium can accumulate when nitrification is slow, common in hypoxic soils.

Plants can perform assimilatory nitrate reduction: They absorb nitrate and reduce it to ammonium, which is then incorporated into amino acids using glutamine synthetase (GS) and glutamate synthase (GOGAT).

Some microorganisms can use nitrate as an electron acceptor in anaerobic respiration, forming nitrite. Among these, some can perform dissimilatory nitrate reduction to ammonium, while others, the so called denitrifying bacteria, synthesise gases such as N_{2} from nitrite.

Diazotrophs, i.e. nitrogen-fixing bacteria either in soil or in symbiosis with plant roots, can synthesise ammonium from N_{2} using nitrogenase.

=== Excretion ===
Ammonium is a metabolic waste product in animals. In many aquatic animals, it is excreted directly. In mammals, sharks, and amphibians, it is converted into urea via the urea cycle. Animals that need to save water, such as birds, reptiles, and terrestrial snails, convert it into uric acid for excretion.

If transport or excretion of ammonium is interrupted, accumulation of ammonium can lead to toxic hyperammonemia. Among other factors, high concentrations of ammonium lead to high concentrations of glutamate, which can interfere with the TCA cycle.

=== Biosynthesis with ammonium ===
Once assimilated, i.e. incorporated into the amino acids glutamine and glutamate, it can be used for the synthesis of other amino acids, proteins, and DNA.

=== Ammonium transporters ===
Transporters or carriers occur widely. Common human transport proteins for ammonium include the Amt/Mep/Rh family. Glutamine synthetase is one participant.

Urea Cycle showing the formation of carbamoyl phosphate in the mitochondria and the rest of the Urea Cycle occurring in the cytoplasm of the liver cell.

Other mechanisms include the Cahill cycle, glutamate, and glutamine to transport ammonium into the mitochondria. This ammonium combines with bicarbonate to form carbamoyl phosphate which then enters the urea cycle to be excreted as urea.

== Human impact ==
Ammonium deposition from the atmosphere has increased in recent years due to volatilization from livestock waste and increased fertilizer use. Because net primary production is often limited by nitrogen, increased ammonium levels could impact the biological communities that rely on it. For example, increasing nitrogen content has been shown to increase plant growth, but aggravate soil phosphorus levels, which can impact microbial communities.

== Metal ==
The ammonium cation has very similar properties to the heavier alkali metal cations and is often considered a close equivalent. Neutral ammonium is expected to behave as a metal ([NH_{4}]^{+} ions in a sea of electrons) at very high pressures, such as inside the giant planets Uranus and Neptune.

While ammonium does not exist as a pure metal under normal conditions, it forms what has variously been described as an amalgam ((NH_{4})·Hg_{n} alloy) or Zintl phase analog ((NH_{4}^{+})·Hg_{n}^{−}) with mercury.

== See also ==
- Onium compounds
- Quaternary ammonium cation ([NR_{4}]^{+}, where R is organyl)
- Tetrafluoroammonium ([NF_{4}]^{+})
- Ammonium transporter
- f-ratio
- Nitrification
- Ammonium hydroxide
