= Lithium borohydride =

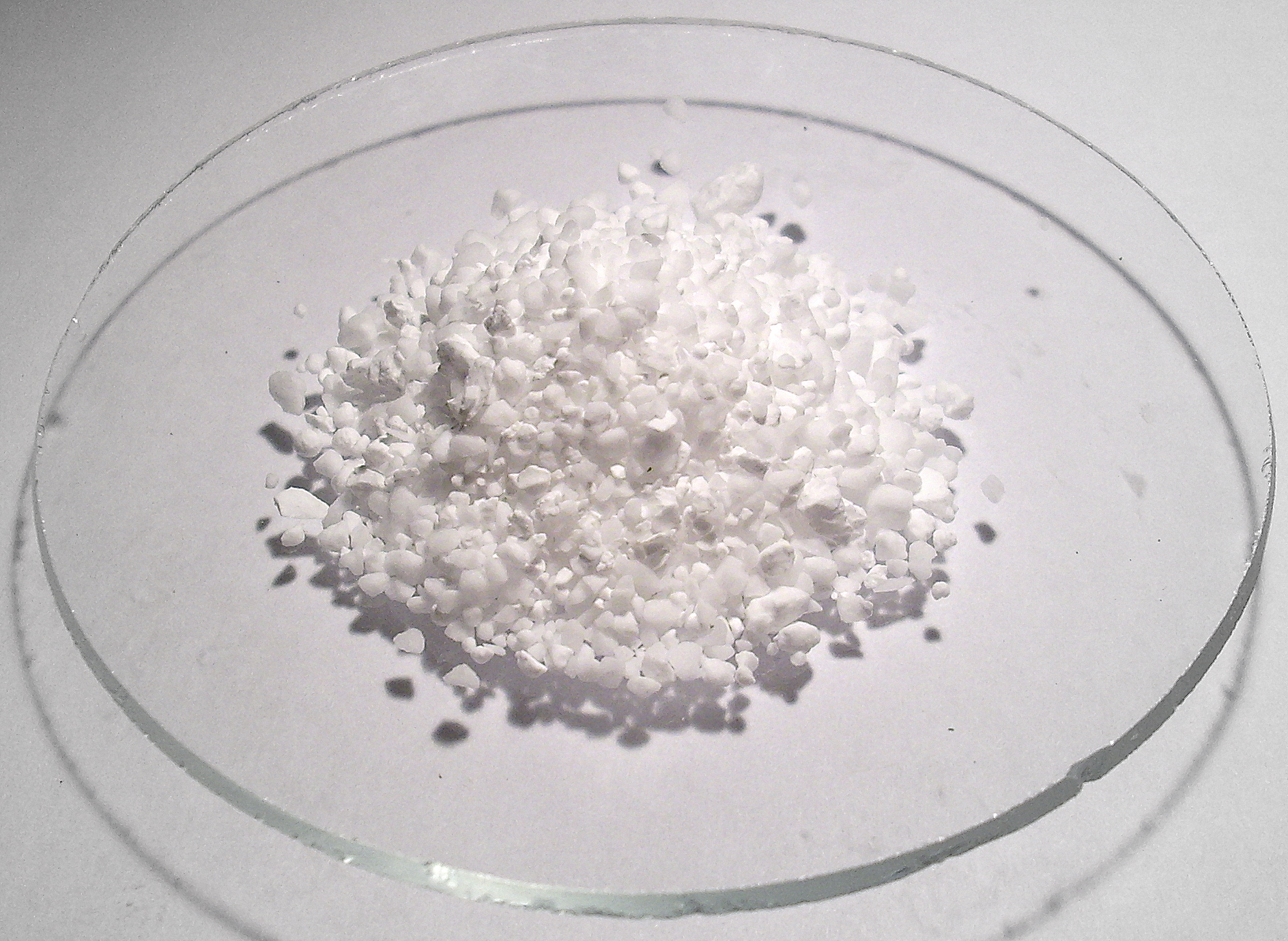

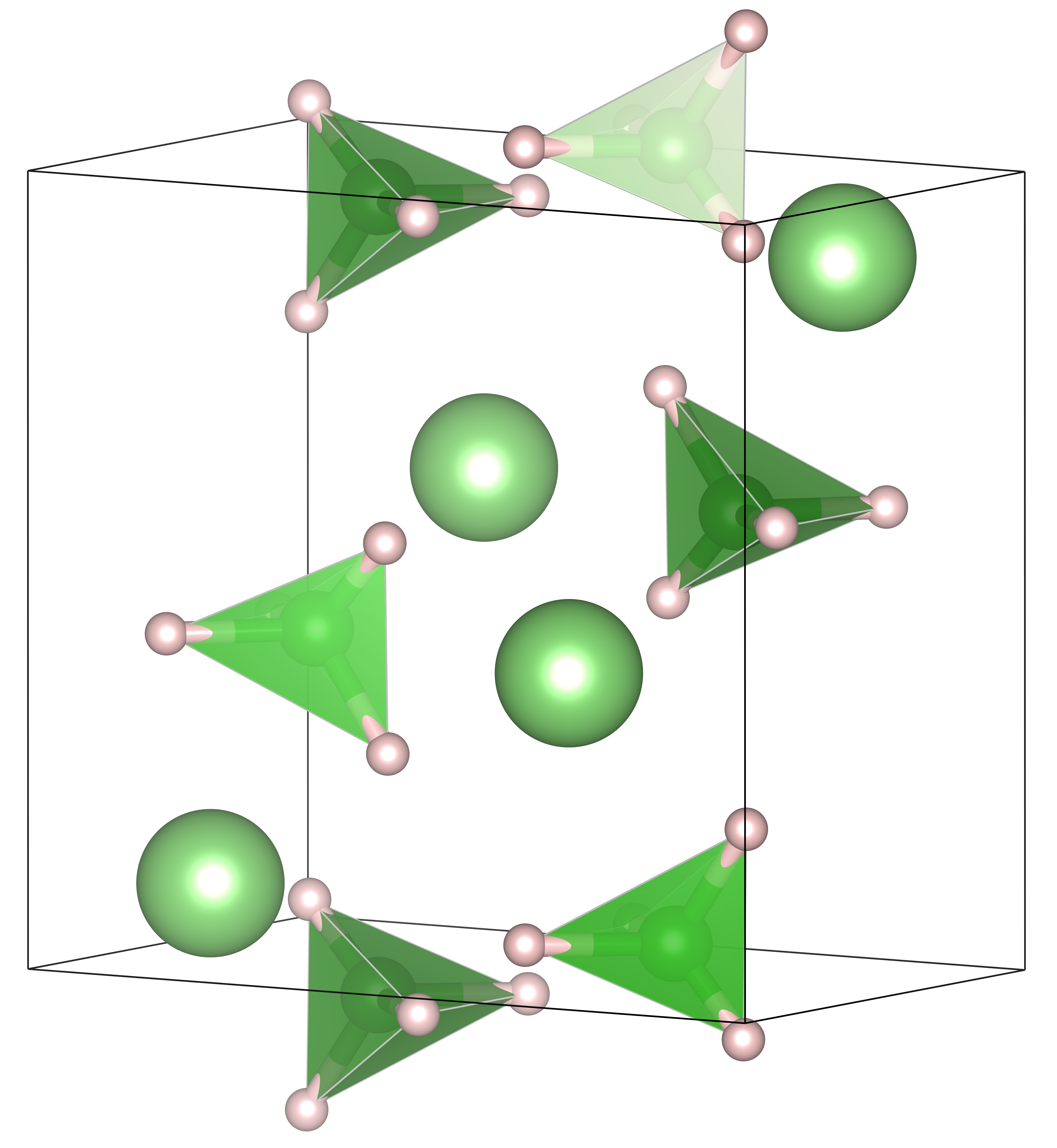
- Unit cell of lithium borohydride at room temperature

Names
- IUPAC name Lithium tetrahydridoborate(1–)
- Other names Lithium hydroborate, Lithium tetrahydroborate Borate(1-), tetrahydro-, lithium, lithium boranate

Identifiers
CAS Number	16949-15-8
3D model (JSmol)	Interactive image
ChemSpider	55732
ECHA InfoCard	100.037.277
PubChem CID	4148881
RTECS number	ED2725000
UNII	8L87X4S4KP
CompTox Dashboard (EPA)	DTXSID40895058
- InChI: InChI=1S/BH4.Li/h1H4;/q-1;+1 Key: UUKMSDRCXNLYOO-UHFFFAOYSA-N; InChI=1/BH4.Li/h1H4;/q-1;+1 Key: UUKMSDRCXNLYOO-UHFFFAOYAS
- SMILES: [Li+].[BH4-]

Properties
Chemical formula	LiBH_{4}
Molar mass	21.78 g·mol^{−1}
Appearance	White solid
Density	0.666 g/cm^{3}
Melting point	268 °C (514 °F; 541 K)
Boiling point	380 °C (716 °F; 653 K) decomposes
Solubility in water	reacts
Solubility in ether	2.5 g/100 mL

Structure
Crystal structure	orthorhombic
Point group	Pnma
Lattice constant	a = 7.17858(4), b = 4.43686(2), c = 6.80321(4)
Lattice volume (V)	216.685(3) A^{3}
Formula units (Z)	4
Coordination geometry	[4]B

Thermochemistry
Heat capacity (C)	82.6 J/(mol⋅K)
Std molar entropy (S^{⦵}_{298})	75.7 J/(mol⋅K)
Std enthalpy of formation (Δ_{f}H^{⦵}_{298})	−198.83 kJ/mol

Hazards
Autoignition temperature	> 180 °C (356 °F; 453 K)
- Except where otherwise noted, data are given for materials in their standard state (at 25 °C [77 °F], 100 kPa). verify (what is ?) Infobox references

Lithium borohydride (LiBH_{4}) is a borohydride and known in organic synthesis as a reducing agent for esters. Although less common than the related sodium borohydride, the lithium salt offers some advantages, being a stronger reducing agent and highly soluble in ethers, whilst remaining safer to handle than lithium aluminium hydride.

== Preparation ==
Lithium borohydride may be prepared by the metathesis reaction, which occurs upon ball-milling the more commonly available sodium borohydride and lithium bromide:

NaBH_{4} + LiBr → NaBr + LiBH_{4}

Alternatively, it may be synthesized by treating boron trifluoride with lithium hydride in diethyl ether:

BF_{3} + 4 LiH → LiBH_{4} + 3 LiF

== Reactions ==
Lithium borohydride is useful as a source of hydride (H^{−}). It can react with a range of carbonyl substrates and other polarized carbon structures to form a hydrogen–carbon bond. It can also react with Brønsted–Lowry-acidic substances (sources of H^{+}) to form hydrogen gas.

=== Reduction reactions ===
As a hydride reducing agent, lithium borohydride is stronger than sodium borohydride but weaker than lithium aluminium hydride. Unlike the sodium analog, it can reduce esters to alcohols, nitriles and primary amides to amines, and can open epoxides. The enhanced reactivity in many of these cases is attributed to the polarization of the carbonyl substrate by complexation to the lithium cation. Unlike the aluminium analog, it does not react with nitro groups, carbamic acids, alkyl halides, or secondary and tertiary amides.

=== Hydrogen generation ===
Lithium borohydride reacts with water to produce hydrogen. This reaction can be used for hydrogen generation.

Although this reaction is usually spontaneous and violent, somewhat-stable aqueous solutions of lithium borohydride can be prepared at low temperature if degassed, distilled water is used and exposure to oxygen is avoided.

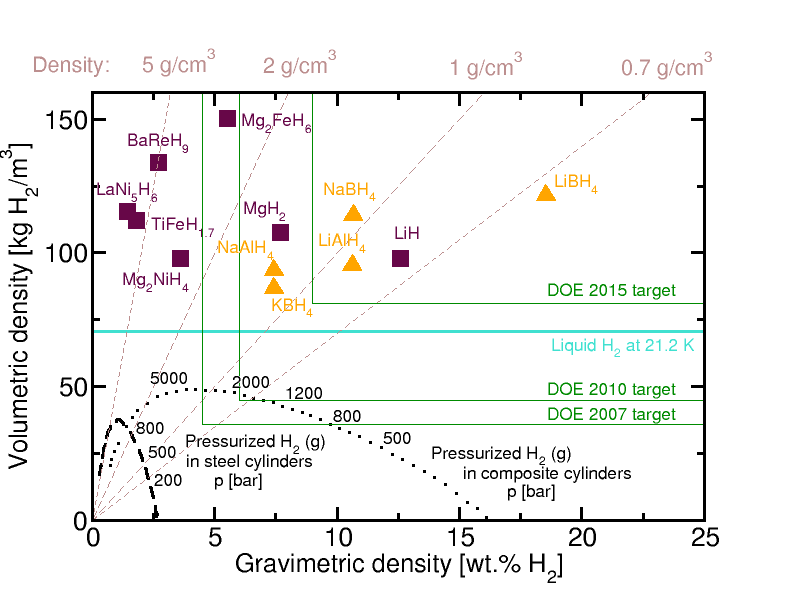
Volumetric vs gravimetric energy density

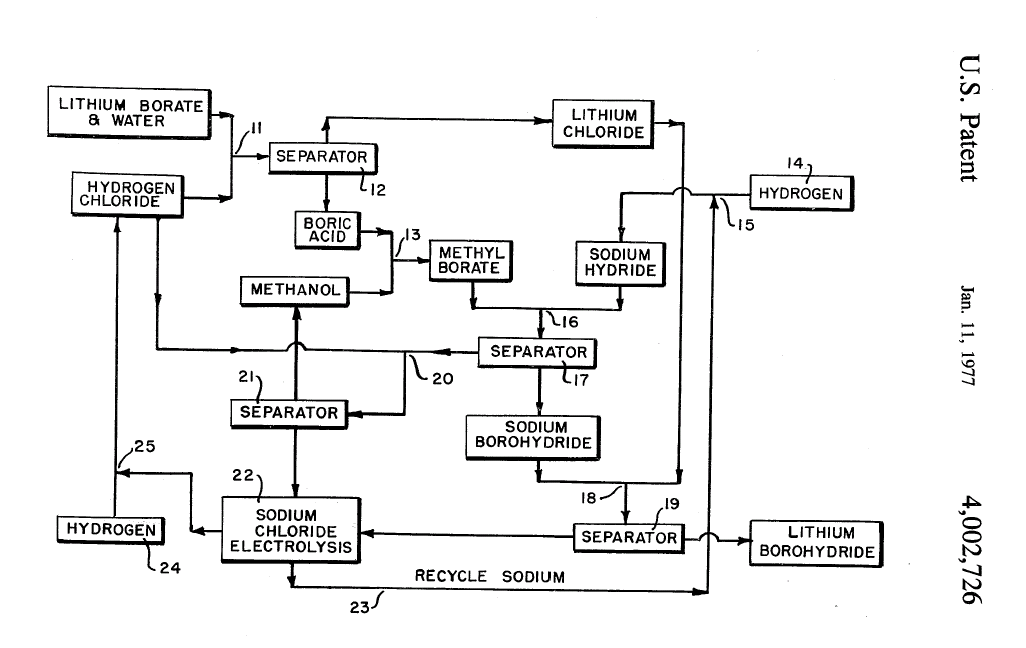
Schematic of lithium borohydride recycling. Inputs are lithium borate and hydrogen.

Lithium borohydride is renowned as one of the highest-energy-density chemical energy carriers. Although of no practicality, the solid liberates 65 MJ/kg heat upon treatment with atmospheric oxygen. Since it has a density of 0.67 g/cm^{3}, oxidation of liquid lithium borohydride gives 43 MJ/L. In comparison, gasoline gives 44 MJ/kg (or 35 MJ/L), while liquid hydrogen gives 120 MJ/kg (or 8.0 MJ/L). (Note: The greater ratio of energy density to specific energy for hydrogen is because of the very low mass density (0.071 g/cm^{3}).) The high specific energy density of lithium borohydride has made it an attractive candidate to propose for automobile and rocket fuel, but despite the research and advocacy, it has not been used widely. As with all chemical-hydride-based energy carriers, lithium borohydride is very complex to recycle (i.e. recharge) and therefore suffers from a low energy conversion efficiency. While batteries such as lithium-ion carry an energy density of up to 0.72 MJ/kg and 2.0 MJ/L, their DC-to-DC conversion efficiency can be as high as 90%. In view of the complexity of recycling mechanisms for metal hydrides, such high energy-conversion efficiencies are not practical with present technology.

Comparison of physical properties
Substance	Specific energy, MJ/kg	Density, g/cm^{3}	Energy density, MJ/L
LiBH_{4}	65.2	0.666	43.4
Regular gasoline	44	0.72	34.8
Liquid hydrogen	120	0.0708	8
Lithium-ion battery	0.72	2.8	2

== Structure ==
Four polymorphs have been described. The stable forms feature tetrahedral BH_{4}^{-} anions.

== See also ==
- Direct borohydride fuel cell
