= Primary =

Primary or primaries may refer to:

== Arts, entertainment, and media ==
=== Music ===
==== Groups and labels ====
- Primary (band), from Australia
- Primary (musician), hip hop musician and record producer from South Korea
- Primary Music, Israeli record label

==== Works ====
- Primary (album) by Rubicon (2002)
- "Primary" (song) by The Cure
- "Primary", song by Spoon from the album Telephono
- "Primary", instrumental by Van Halen from the album Van Halen III

=== Other uses in arts, entertainment, and media ===
- Primaries or primary beams, in E. E. Smith's science-fiction series Lensman
- Primary (film), American political documentary (1960)

== Computing ==
- PRIMARY, an X Window selection
- Primary data storage, computer technology used to retain digital data
- Primary server, main server on the server farm

== Education ==
- Primary education, the first stage of compulsory education
- Primary FRCA, academic examination for anaesthetists in the U.K.
- Primary school, school providing primary education

== Mathematics ==
- p-group of prime power order
- Primary decomposition into primary ideals
- Primary ideals, concept in commutative algebra
- Primary number, positive integer power of a prime number

== Politics ==
- Primary elections or primaries, elections held to determine which candidates will run for an upcoming general election
- Primary vote, the total of first-preference votes in the Australian electoral system

== Science and mechanics ==
- Primary (astronomy), the larger of two co-orbiting bodies
- Primary (chemistry), term used in organic chemistry
- Primary, the oldest period in the Geologic time scale (obsolete), combining the Precambrian and Paleozoic
- Primary, a stage in a thermonuclear explosive
- Primary circuit, electrical circuit in a transformer that receives current, as opposed to secondary circuit
- Primary field, type of field in conformal field theory
- Primary mirror, principal light-gathering surface of a reflecting telescope
- Primary power line, electric power transmission line fed to or from a transformer
- Primary feathers, flight feathers attached to the manus ("hand") in the wings of birds
- Primary color

== Other uses ==
- Primary (LDS Church), a children's Sunday School organization
- Primary (musician) (born 1983), South Korean
- Primary data (or raw data), a term for data collected from a source
- Primary Flight Training, in the U.S. Navy
- Primary source, original materials
- Primary disease, a disease that is due to a root cause of illness
- Christian Science practitioner#Primary class instruction

== See also ==
- Binary (disambiguation)
- Primary group (disambiguation)
- Second (disambiguation)
- Unary (disambiguation)
