= Geminal halide hydrolysis =

Geminal halide hydrolysis is an organic reaction. The reactants are geminal dihalides with a water molecule or a hydroxide ion. The reaction yields ketones from secondary halides or aldehydes from primary halides.

== Reaction mechanism ==
The first part of the reaction mechanism consists of an ordinary nucleophilic aliphatic substitution to produce a gem-halohydrin:

RCH(Cl)_{2} + KOH $\longrightarrow$ RCH(OH)Cl + KCl

The remaining halide is a good leaving group and this enables the newly created hydroxy group to convert into a carbonyl group by expelling the halide:

RCH(OH)Cl $\longrightarrow$Rearrangement gives R-CHO + HCl

== Variations ==
Other functional groups can undergo similar hydrolysis reactions. For instance, geminal trihalides (e.g. benzotrichloride) can be partially hydrolyzed to acyl halides (e.g. benzoyl chloride) in a similar way. Further hydrolysis yields carboxylic acids.

== See also ==
- Stephen aldehyde synthesis
