= Tetrakis(hydroxymethyl)phosphonium sulfate =

- Molecular structure of tetrakis(hydroxymethyl)phosphonium sulfate

Names
- Systematic IUPAC name Bis(tetrakis(hydroxymethyl)phosphanium) sulfate
- Other names: Tetrakis(hydroxymethyl)phosphonium sulfate; THPS

Identifiers
CAS Number	55566-30-8
3D model (JSmol)	Interactive image
ChEMBL	ChEMBL1549844
ChemSpider	37846
ECHA InfoCard	100.054.263
EC Number	259-709-0
PubChem CID	41478
UNII	5I8RSL9E6S
UN number	2922
CompTox Dashboard (EPA)	DTXSID0021331
- InChI: InChI=1S/2C4H12O4P.H2O4S/c2*5-1-9(2-6,3-7)4-8;1-5(2,3)4/h2*5-8H,1-4H2;(H2,1,2,3,4)/q2*+1;/p-2 Key: YIEDHPBKGZGLIK-UHFFFAOYSA-L
- SMILES: C(O)[P+](CO)(CO)CO.C(O)[P+](CO)(CO)CO.[O-]S(=O)(=O)[O-]

Properties
Chemical formula	C_{8}H_{24}O_{12}P_{2}S
Molar mass	406.28 g·mol^{−1}
Density	1.41 g/cm^{3}
- Except where otherwise noted, data are given for materials in their standard state (at 25 °C [77 °F], 100 kPa). Infobox references

Tetrakis(hydroxymethyl)phosphonium sulfate (THPS) is an organic compound with the formula [P(CH_{2}OH)_{4}]_{2}SO_{4}. It is a phosphonium salt that dissolves in water to give two tetrakis(hydroxymethyl)phosphonium cations and one sulfate anion. The tetrakis(hydroxymethyl)phosphonium is a quaternary cation is composed of a central phosphorus(IV) atom linked to four hydroxymethyl groups.

THPS is widely used as a non-oxidizing biocide in industrial water systems. It is commonly applied in the oil and gas industry for the control of sulfate-reducing microorganisms and other microorganisms in produced water, injection water, and hydraulic fracturing fluids, where it helps mitigate microbiologically influenced corrosion (MIC) and reservoir souring. THPS is also used in cooling towers, paper and pulp processing, and metalworking fluids to control microbial growth and biofilm formation. In addition to its biocidal properties, THPS has applications as a flame retardant treatment for textiles and as a component in water treatment formulations due to its relatively rapid degradation into less persistent byproducts compared to some alternative biocides.
