= Quaternary (disambiguation) =

The Quaternary is a geologic period.

Quaternary (an adjective meaning "fourth in order" or "composed of four items") may also refer to:

- Quaternary (chemistry) (see also Quaternary compound and Quaternary phase)
- Quaternary structure of proteins
- Quaternary sector of the economy, which encompasses knowledge-based services
- Quaternary care, health care that includes highly specialized or experimental treatments
- Quaternary numeral system (base-4) in mathematics
- Quaternary counting system, as used in some human languages
- Quaternary (EP), an album by Mötley Crüe
- Quaternary star system, a star system that contains four stars

== See also ==
- Quinary, positional number system with base 5
- Ternary (disambiguation)
- Tertiary (disambiguation)
