= Tertiary =

Tertiary (from Latin, meaning "third" or "of the third degree/order") may refer to:

- Tertiary, a member of the third order of a religious order
- Tertiary period, an obsolete geologic period spanning from 66 to 2.6 million years ago
- Tertiary (chemistry), a term describing bonding patterns in organic chemistry
- Tertiary care, specialized consultative healthcare
- Tertiary color, a color made up by mixing one primary color with one secondary color, in a given color space
- Tertiary consumer, in ecology
- Tertiary education, educational levels following the completion of secondary education such as university or trade school
- Tertiary feathers or tertials, feathers attached to humerus or inner portion of the wings of birds
- Tertiary sector of the economy, or the service sector
- Tertiary source, in research
- Tertiary stress, a proposed level of stress in phonetics
- In biochemistry, the tertiary structure of a protein is its overall shape, also known as its fold

== See also ==
- Ternary (disambiguation)
- Secondary (disambiguation)
- Quaternary (disambiguation)
