= Binary =

Binary may refer to:

== Science and technology ==
=== Mathematics ===
- Binary number, a representation of numbers using only two values (0 and 1) for each digit
- Binary function, a function that takes two arguments
- Binary operation, a mathematical operation that takes two arguments
- Binary relation, a relation involving two elements
- Finger binary, a system for counting in binary numbers on the fingers of human hands

=== Computing ===
- Binary code, the representation of text and data using only the digits 1 and 0
- Bit, or binary digit, the basic unit of information in computers
- Binary file, composed of something other than human-readable text
  - Executable, a type of binary file that contains machine code for the computer to execute
- Binary tree, a computer tree data structure in which each node has at most two children
- Binary-coded decimal, a method for encoding for decimal digits in binary sequences

=== Astronomy ===
- Binary star, a star system with two stars in it
  - X-ray binary, a type of stellar binary that is luminous in x-ray frequencies
- Binary planet, two planetary bodies of comparable mass orbiting each other
- Binary asteroid, two asteroids orbiting each other

=== Biology ===
- Binary fission, the splitting of a single-celled organism into two daughter cells

=== Chemistry ===
- Binary phase, a chemical compound containing two different chemical elements

== Arts and entertainment ==
- Binary (Doctor Who audio)

=== Marvel Comics ===
- Binary, the name of two superheroines in the Marvel Universe
  - Binary (Carol Danvers), a Marvel Comics character
  - Binary (Marvel Cinematic Universe), or Maria Rambeau, a Marvel Cinematic Universe character

=== Music ===
- Binary form, a way of structuring a piece of music
- Binary (Ani DiFranco album), 2017
- Binary (Kay Tse album), 2008
- "Binary" (song), a 2007 single by Assemblage 23

=== Novel ===
- Binary (novel), a 1972 novel by Michael Crichton (writing as John Lange)
- Binary, an evil organization in the novel InterWorld

== Other uses ==
- Binary opposition, polar opposites, often ignoring the middle ground
- Gender binary, the classification of gender into two distinct and disconnected forms of masculine and feminine

== See also ==
- Binary logic (disambiguation)
- Binomial (disambiguation)
- Boolean (disambiguation)
- Continuum
- Secondary (disambiguation)
- Ternary (disambiguation)
- Unary (disambiguation)
