= Secondari =

Secondari is a surname. Notable people with the surname include:

- Argo Secondari (1895–1942), Italian anarchist and militant anti-fascist
- John Hermes Secondari (1919 – 1975), American author and television producer

== See also ==
- Secondary
