= Secondary =

Secondary may refer to:

== Science and nature ==
- Secondary emission, of particles
  - Secondary electrons, electrons generated as ionization products
- The secondary winding, or the electrical or electronic circuit connected to the secondary winding in a transformer
- Secondary (chemistry), a term used in organic chemistry to classify various types of compounds
- Secondary color, color made from mixing primary colors
- Secondary mirror, second mirror element/focusing surface in a reflecting telescope
- Secondary craters, often called "secondaries"
- Secondary consumer, in ecology
- An antiquated name for the Mesozoic in geosciences
- Secondary feathers, flight feathers attached to the ulna on the wings of birds

== Society and culture ==
- Secondary (football), a position in American football and Canadian football
- Secondary dominant in music
- Secondary education, education which typically takes place after six years of primary education
  - Secondary school, the type of school at the secondary level of education
- Secondary market, an aftermarket where financial assets are traded

== See also ==
- Second (disambiguation)
- Binary (disambiguation)
- Primary (disambiguation)
- Tertiary (disambiguation)
