= Quat =

Quat may refer to:

- Quaternary ammonium cations, known as quats
- Elizabeth Quat (born 1966), Hong Kong politician
- Phan Huy Quát, former prime minister of South Vietnam

== See also ==
- Qat (disambiguation)
- Quaternary (disambiguation)
- Quaternion, an extension of the complex numbers
- Khat, a flowering plant whose leaves are chewed as a stimulant
