= Boolean algebra (disambiguation) =

Boolean algebra is the algebra of truth values and operations on them.

Boolean algebra may also refer to:

- Boolean algebra (structure), any member of a certain class of mathematical structures that can be described in terms of an ordering or in terms of operations on a set
- Two-element Boolean algebra, Boolean algebra whose underlying set has two elements
- Boolean ring

== See also ==
- Boolean (disambiguation)
