= Ora Ito =

French designer

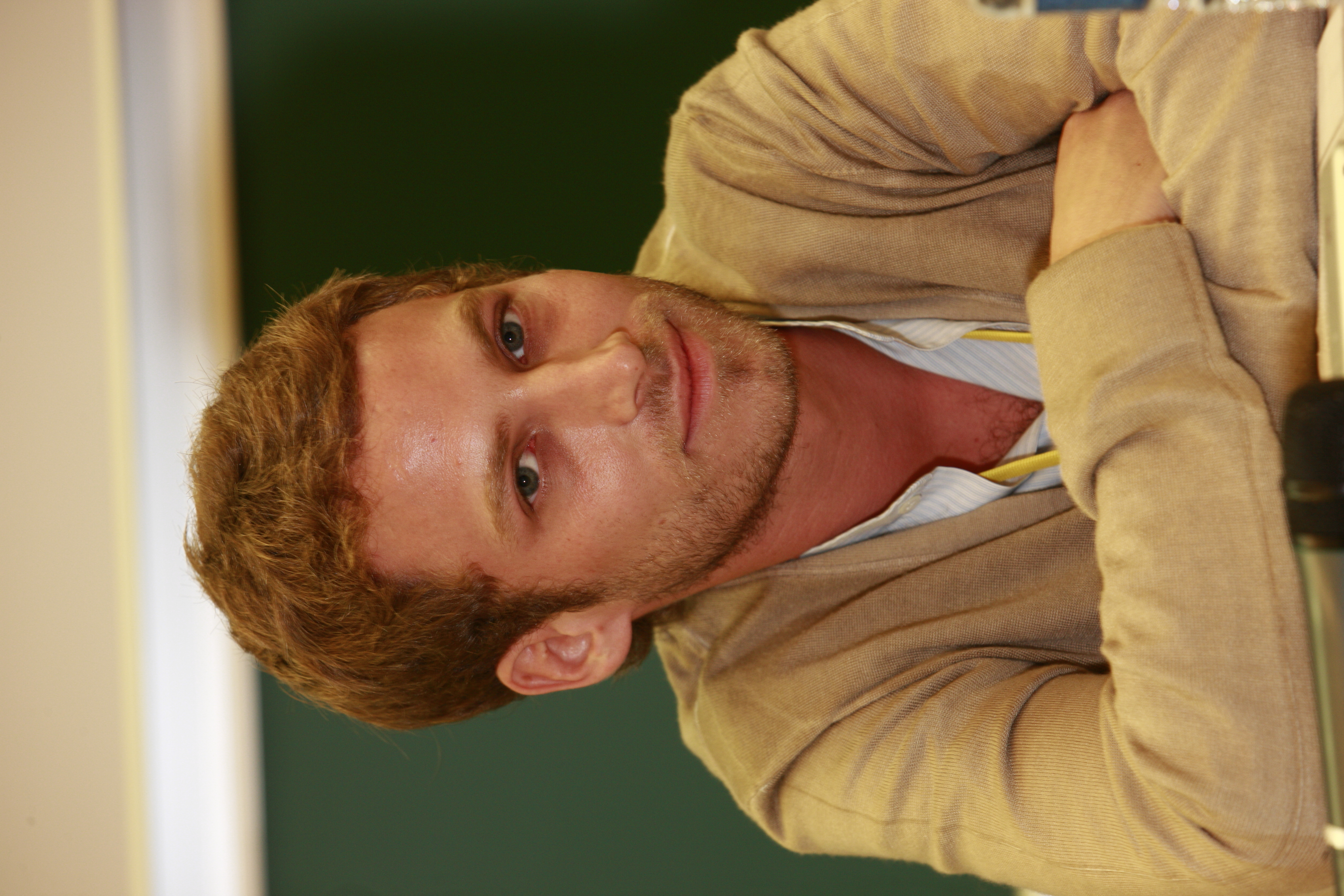

Ito Morabito (born 1977), known as Ora Ito, is a French industrial and interior designer working under the brand name Ora-Ïto. He created designs for Swatch, Gorenje, Heineken and Davidoff.

Ito was born and grew up in Marseille, France. His style has been described as one of simplexity and as minimalist.
