= Ternar =

Ternar may refer to:

- Tomislav Ternar, a Slovenian tennis player
- in mathematics, a triple system

== See also ==
- Ternary (disambiguation)
