= Ternary =

Ternary (from Latin ternarius) or trinary is an adjective meaning "composed of three items". It can refer to:

== Mathematics and logic ==
- Ternary numeral system, a base-3 counting system
  - Balanced ternary, a positional numeral system, useful for comparison logic
- Ternary logic, a logic system with the values true, false, and some other value
- Ternary plot or ternary graph, a plot that shows the ratios of three proportions
- Ternary relation, a finitary relation in which the number of places in the relation is three
- Ternary operation, an operation that takes three parameters
- Ternary function, a function that takes three arguments

== Computing ==
- Ternary signal, a signal that can assume three significant values
- Ternary computer, a computer using a ternary numeral system
- Ternary tree, a tree data structure in computer science
  - Ternary search tree, a ternary (three-way) tree data structure of strings
- Ternary search, a computer science technique for finding the minimum or maximum of a function
- Ternary heap, a data structure in computer science
- Ternary Golay code, a perfect [11, 6, 5] ternary linear code
- ?:, a ternary conditional operator used for basic conditional expressions in several programming languages

== Other uses ==
- Ternary complex, a complex formed by the interaction of three molecules
- Ternary compound, a type of chemical compound
- Ternary form, a form used for structuring music
- Ternary name for any taxon below the rank of species

== See also ==
- Tertiary (disambiguation)
- Binary (disambiguation)
- Quaternary (disambiguation)
