= Gender binary =

Classification of sex and gender into two opposite forms

Iconic figures used to represent a woman and a man, often displayed outside public toilets

The gender binary (also known as gender binarism) is the classification of gender into two distinct forms of masculine and feminine, whether by social system, cultural belief, or both simultaneously. (Note: In this context the word "binary" often functions as a noun, unlike several other uses of the word, where it is an adjective.) Most cultures use a gender binary, having two genders (boys/men and girls/women).

In this binary model, gender and sexuality may be assumed by default to align with one's sex assigned at birth. This may include certain expectations of how one dresses themselves, one's behavior, sexual orientation, names or pronouns, which restroom one uses, and other qualities. For example, when a male is born, gender binarism may assume that the male will be masculine in appearance, have masculine character traits and behaviors, as well as having a heterosexual attraction to females. These expectations may reinforce negative attitudes, biases, and discrimination towards people who display expressions of gender variance or nonconformity or those whose gender identity is incongruent with the sex they have been assigned at birth.

== General ==
The term gender binary describes the system in which a society allocates its members into one of two sets of gender roles and gender identities, which assign attributes based on their biological sex (chromosomal and genitalia). In the case of intersex people, the gender binary system is limited. Those who are intersex have rare genetic differences which can give them the sex organs of both sexes or otherwise non-normative genitalia and may have difficulties fitting into the gender binary system.

Scholars who study the gender binary from an intersectional feminist and critical race theory perspective argue that during the process of European colonization in North and South America, a binary system of gender was enforced as a means of maintaining patriarchal norms and upholding European nationalism. The binary system has also been critiqued as scholars claim that biological sex and gender differ from one another; with sex relating to biological and chromosomal differences between males, females, and intersex people, while gender instead is a result of sociocultural socialization.

Traditional gender roles are influenced and preserved by the media, religion, mainstream education, political systems, cultural systems, and social systems.

=== Language ===
In English, some nouns (e.g., boy), honorific titles (e.g., Miss), occupational titles (e.g., actress), and personal pronouns (e.g., she, his) are gendered, and they fall into a male/female binary. Personal pronouns in the English language are typically associated with either men (he/him) or women (she/her), which excludes people who do not identify as a man or a woman. However, gender-neutral pronouns, such as singular they pronouns (they/them) are sometimes used by nonbinary and gender nonconforming individuals as well as in situations where the gender is unknown. A 2019 study found that "close to 1 in 5 Americans personally know someone who uses gender-neutral pronouns such as 'they' instead of 'he' or "'she'". In addition, people may use neopronouns in place of other personal pronouns. Examples of neopronouns include xe/xem, ze/zim, and sie/hir.

According to Hyde and colleagues, children raised within English-speaking (and other gendered-language) environments come to view gender as a binary category. They state that for children who learn English as their primary language in the United States, adults' use of the gender binary to explicitly sort individuals (i.e. "boys" and "girls" bathrooms and sports teams), and not just the presence of gender markers, causes gender biases. Those biases can appear in information processing, and can affect attitudes and behavior directed at those both inside and outside of the gender binary language system. An example of this would be the use of gendered language in job descriptions and advertisements: those who are excluded by the language used may not apply for the position, leading to a segregated field of work. For example, women could be systemically excluded from a workplace or career that exclusively uses the pronouns "he" to advertise new job openings. The exclusive use of "she" and "he" (binary pronouns) can also systemically exclude those who do not fit within the gender binary and may prefer gender neutral language.

Language is constantly in flux, particularly language concerning the gender binary. For example, in Sweden a proposal was published in a national newspaper to expand the personal pronouns of hon (she) and han (he) to also include hen. The article was met with a variety of reactions. Many argued in support that hen could operate as a pronoun for nonbinary individuals who preferred it, and would make language more gender fair and be able to avoid binary labels imposed on things like workplace advertisements. Others had the opinion that the use of hen would be inconsequential in the advance of gender equality in Sweden, and would be confusing for children. The inclusion of hen challenges preconceived notions of what gender and language can mean together, and proposes new possibilities of how gender is defined outside of a binary system.

Along with using the gender binary to categorize human bodies, cultures that obey the binary may also use it to label things, places, and ideas. For example, in American culture, people identify playing sports as a masculine activity and shopping as a feminine activity; blue is a color for boys while pink is for girls; care work is a feminine profession while management is associated with masculinity, etc.

Some languages gender their words into masculine and feminine forms, such as French or Spanish.

=== Education ===
The gender binary is introduced unconsciously at a young age, often within familial and school settings. For example, those considered to be girls are expected to be emotional, affectionate, talk excessively, complain more than average, and be picky about their surroundings and appearances, while boys are expected to be cruel, dominant, and act as a leader in group settings. These characteristic while stereotypes, can be encouraged and influenced through objects like toys (e.g. baby dolls introducing maternal and domestic labor) but also in schools. Girls are often expected to excel in English classes, while boys are expected to succeed in P.E. and STEM courses. Early childhood stereotypes like boys being better at math than girls have been linked to the disproportionately small number of women pursuing math related careers, and a general disengagement from math related courses in education. There has been an increase in publishing children books targeted at girls to encourage more participation in STEM fields and to dismantle gendered stereotypes taught to children by popular media.

=== Religion ===
Major religions often teach a gender binary and act as authorities for gender roles. Many Christians teach that the gender binary is both good and normal, pointing to the gender binary evident in the creation story of the Book of Genesis in the Bible, where it is declared that, "God created man in His own image; in the image of God He created him; male and female He created them." Carol S. Wimmer suggests that the Genesis creation narrative implies a linguistic gender binary of "form, essence, or purpose of role" but not of "sexuality, sexual function, or sexual activity".

== In the LGBTQ+ community ==
Gender binarism may create institutionalized structures of power, and individuals who identify outside traditional gender binaries may experience discrimination and harassment. Many LGBTQ+ people, notably youth activist groups, advocate against gender binarism. Many individuals within the LGBTQ+ community report an internal hierarchy of power status. Some who do not identify within a binary system experience being at the bottom of the hierarchy. Different variables such as race, ethnicity, age, gender, and more can lower or raise one's perceived power.

There are many individuals and several subcultures that can be considered exceptions to the gender binary or specific transgender identities worldwide. In addition to individuals whose bodies are naturally intersex, there are also specific ceremonial and social roles that are seen as third gender. The hijra of South Asia and some Two-Spirit Indigenous Peoples of North America are often cited as examples. Feminist philosopher María Lugones argues that Western colonizers imposed their dualistic ideas of gender on indigenous peoples, replacing pre-existing indigenous concepts.

In the contemporary West, non-binary or genderqueer people do not adhere to the gender binary by refusing terms like "male" and "female", as they do not identify as either. Transgender people have a unique place in relation to the gender binary. In some cases, attempting to conform to societal expectations for their gender, transgender individuals may opt for surgery, hormones, or both.

Ball culture is an example of how the LGBT community interprets and rejects the gender binary. Paris is Burning, a film directed by Jennie Livingston, depicts New York's ballroom scene in the late 1980s. To compete in the balls, men, women, and everyone in between create costumes and walk in their respective categories: Butch Queen, Transmale Realness, and Femme Queen to name a few. During the balls, the gender binary is thrown out the window, and the people competing are allowed to express themselves however they interpret the category. Within the scenes of people competing in various categories there is a narrative that describes life outside the gender binary in New York. Since the film came out, there has been a decline in the ballroom scene due to the rise of media and the appropriation of the drag culture.

== Criticism of the binary ==
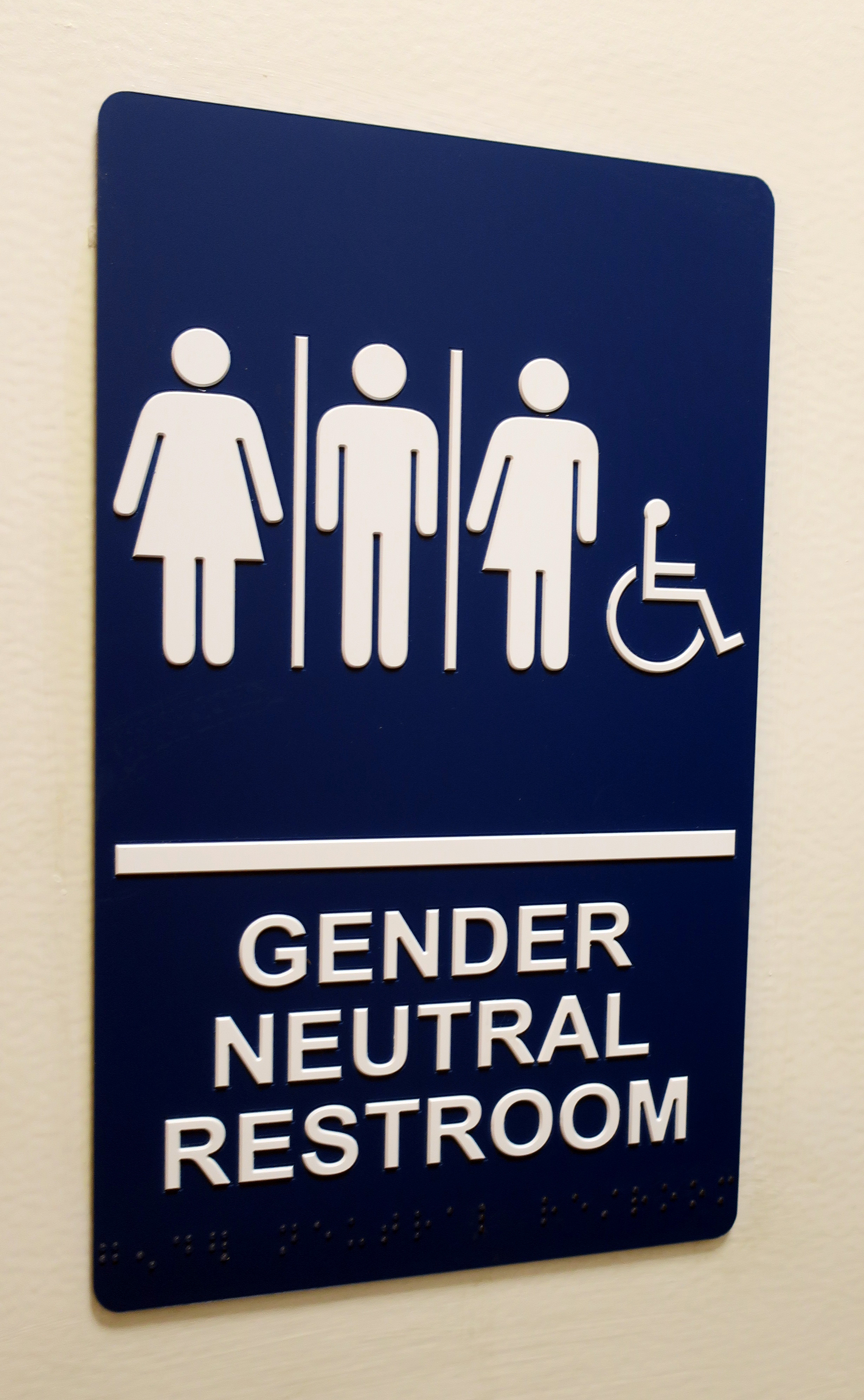
Gender neutral restroom sign

Some scholars have contested the existence of a clear gender binary. Judith Lorber explains the problem of failing to question dividing people into these two groups "even though they often find more significant within-group differences than between-group differences." Lorber argues that this corroborates the fact that the gender binary is arbitrary and leads to false expectations of both men and women. Instead, there is growing support for the possibility of utilizing additional categories that compare people without "prior assumptions about who is like whom".

This idea of a gender as a binary is thought to be an oppressive means of reflecting differential power dynamics.

=== Stereotypes ===
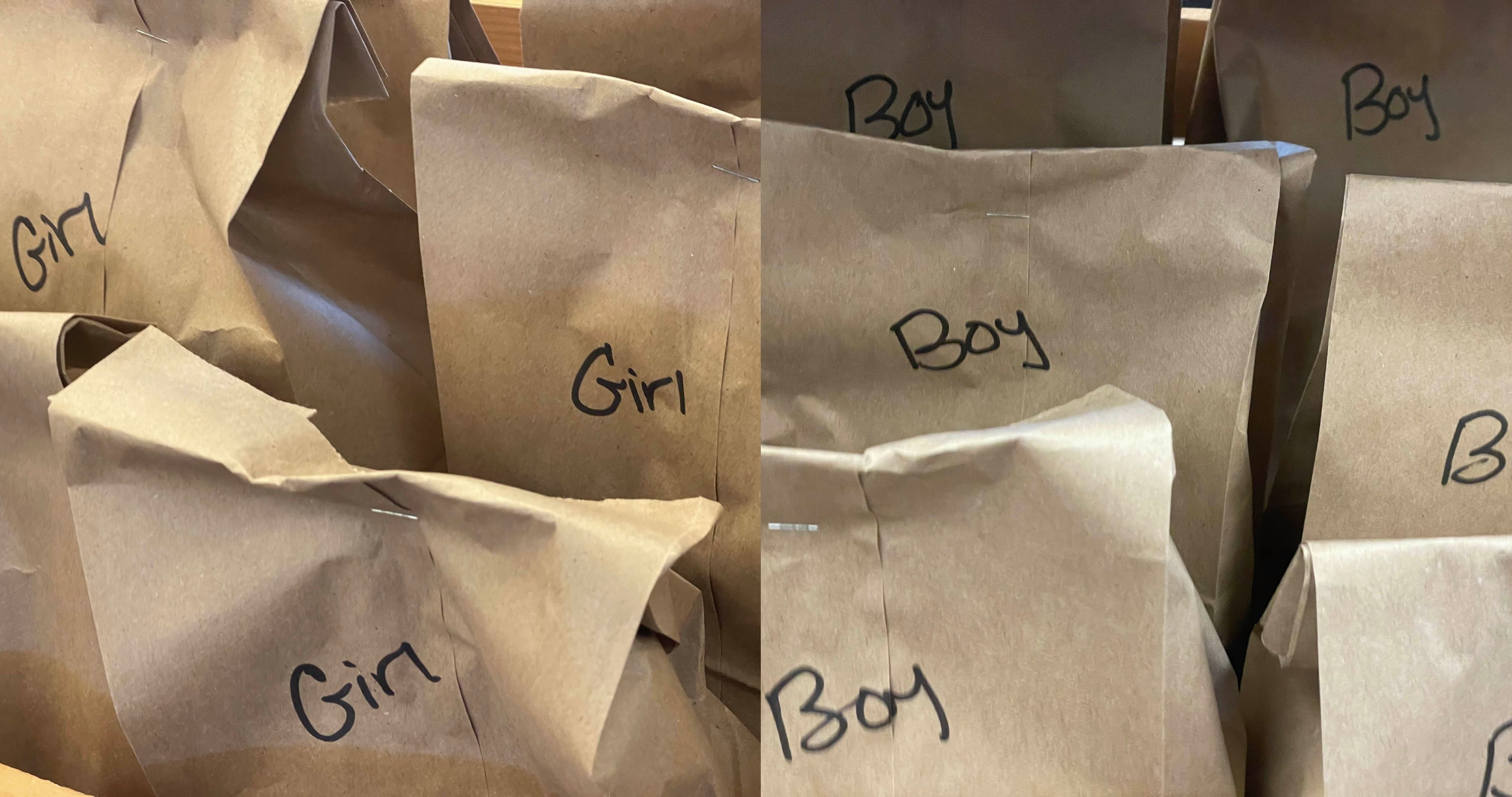

Gendered stereotypes maintain the gender binary and the systems of power within it.

People outside of the gender binary also experience harmful stereotypes, and are both affected by cisgender stereotypes and biases regarding being transgender or gender nonconforming. For example, the labels "mentally ill" and "confused" are stereotypes uniquely assigned to transgender individuals by cisgender people. Interesting enough, transgender children themselves appear to endorse less gender stereotypes at a young age and are tolerant of larger levels of gender nonconformity. Often, stereotypes applied by cisgender individuals to transgender and gender nonconforming people are a combination of stereotypes surrounding biological sex and broader stereotypes about transgender identities. These result in conflicting and false images that directly and violently harm trans people; a study in conducted in 2021 found that cis individuals would stereotype a trans-man as "aggressive like cis-men, weak like cis-women, and mentally ill like trans-women." Transphobic stereotypes like these contribute to violence against trans and gender nonconforming communities, where transgender individuals are physically assaulted or killed, misgendered, denied access to spaces that affirm their identity, and are legally blocked from changing their identifies on government and other official documents. Discrimination and assault rates are even higher for trans and gender nonconforming people of color than their white counterparts. In 2017, a study found that it was 2.7 times more likely for BIPOC trans and gender nonconforming individuals to be sexually or physically assaulted and intimidated than white transgender and gender nonconforming people.

=== Cisnormativity ===
Cisnormativity is a product of the gender binary that assumes people are cisgender, meaning that their gender identity matches their sex assigned at birth. Both binary and nonbinary transgender individuals are excluded from this ideology. This leads to individuals outside the gender binary experiencing disparities in health and violence at individual, interpersonal, and institutional levels due to their non-normative status.

== Discrimination ==
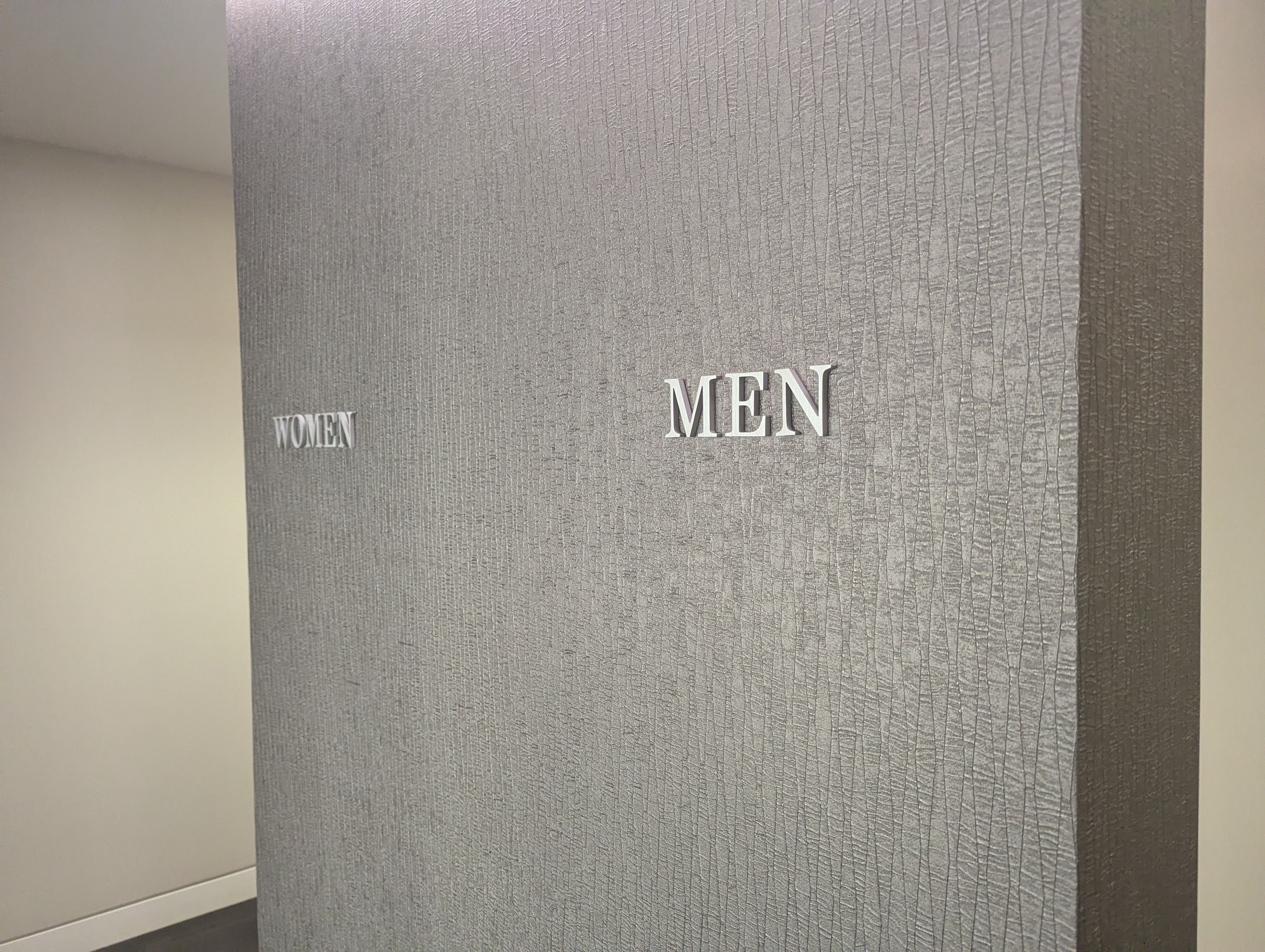
Bathroom signs for men and women at the Heritage Foundation

The gender binary, and especially unwavering belief in the binary, creates a hierarchal system in which those who are gender nonconforming, transgender, non-binary and so forth may be pathologized, be viewed as abnormal, disrupting the "status quo" and may be discriminated and harmed as a result.

Discrimination against transgender or gender nonconforming people can take various forms, from physical or sexual assault, homicide, limited access to public spaces, in healthcare and more. The gender binary has been critiqued by scholars of intersectionality, some of whom have suggested that it is a structure that maintains patriarchal and white supremacist norms as part of an interlocking hierarchical system of gender and race.

=== Healthcare ===
Gender binarism poses limitations on the adequacy of medical care provided to gender-nonconforming patients. There is a large gap in medical literature on non-binary populations who have unique healthcare needs. A lack of cultural competency about nonbinary gender identities among providers contributes to nonbinary transgender individuals facing greater health disparities than both binary transgender and cisgender individuals.

== In media ==
There are many public figures that have opposed the gender binary by wearing clothing not typically associated with their perceived gender or their gender identity, such as Prince, David Bowie, Kurt Cobain, Jaden Smith, Ruby Rose, Rain Dove, Billy Porter, and Harry Styles. Public figures that identify as of non-binary gender include Sam Smith, Indya Moore, Jack Haven, King Princess, Jonathan Van Ness, Bex Taylor-Klaus, Amandla Stenberg, Demi Lovato, and more.

A popular figure in the music industry, Harry Styles' appearance on the cover of American Vogue in 2020 was popular for his rejection of gendered clothing norms. Styles rejected the implicit separation of feminine and masculine by wearing both a dress, a clothing item associated with women, as well as a blazer, which is associated with men for the Vogue cover. His embrace of both clothing associated with women and men is a rejection of the gender binary.

== See also ==
- Androgyny – Having both male and female characteristics
- Anti-gender movement – International movement opposed to the concept of gender identity
- Butch and femme – Masculine and feminine identities in lesbians
- Dyad – Group of two people
- Effeminacy – Feminine qualities in boys or men
- Endosex – Opposite of intersex
- Complementarianism – Theological view on gender roles
- Gender dysphoria – Mental distress due to gender incongruence
- Gender essentialism – Attribution of intrinsic qualities to genders
- Gender in Bugis society – Indonesian ethnic group, Bugis, with the view that gender exists on a spectrum
- Gender polarization – Sociological concept by Sandra Bem
- Gender policing – Enforcement of normative gender expressions
- Postgenderism – Movement against gender roles
- Sexual inversion – Outdated term referring to homosexuality
