= Unary =

Unary may refer to:

- Unary numeral system, the simplest numeral system to represent natural numbers
- Unary function, a function that takes one argument; in computer science, a unary operator is a subset of unary function
- Unary operation, a kind of mathematical operator that has only one operand
- Unary relation, a mathematical relation that has one argument
- Unary coding, an entropy encoding that represents a number n with n − 1 ones followed by a zero

== See also ==
- Primary (disambiguation)
- Binary (disambiguation)
