= Qat =

Qat or QAT may refer to:

- Qaumi Awami Tehreek (QAT), a faction of the Awami Tahreek political party, Pakistan
- Khat or qat, a flowering plant whose leaves are chewed as a stimulant
- Qat (deity), in the oral mythology of the Banks Islands, Vanuatu
- Intel QuickAssist Technology (QAT), a cryptographic accelerator; for example see List of Intel Atom processors

== See also ==
- Quat (disambiguation)
- The Qat Collection, a 1994 album by Sasha
- Qatar (ISO 3166-1 alpha-3 code), a country
