= Quaternary compound =

Chemical compound made of four elements

Quaternary ammonium cation. The Rs may be the same or different groups. (The Rs may also be connected, making a cyclic ion.)

In chemistry, a quaternary compound is a compound consisting of exactly four chemical elements.

In another use of the term in organic chemistry, a quaternary compound is or has a cation consisting of a central positively charged atom with four substituents, especially organic (alkyl and aryl) groups, discounting hydrogen atoms.

The best-known quaternary compounds are quaternary ammonium salts, having a nitrogen atom at the center. For example, in the following reaction, the nitrogen atom is said to be quaternized as it has gone from 3 to 4 substituents:

R_{3}N + RCl → R_{4}N^{+}Cl^{−}

Other examples include substituted phosphonium salts (R_{4}P^{+}), substituted arsonium salts (R_{4}As^{+}) like arsenobetaine, as well as some arsenic-containing superconductors. Substituted stibonium (R_{4}Sb^{+}) and bismuthonium salts (R_{4}Bi^{+}) have also been described.

== See also ==
- Binary compound
- Ternary compound
- Onium ion
- Quaternary phase
