= Binary logic =

Binary logic may refer to:

- Boolean logic, a two-valued formal logic
  - Logic gates implementing Boolean logic in digital electronics
- Bivalent logic or two-valued logic, a logic satisfying the principle of bivalence

== See also ==
- Bayesian logic
- Binary numeral system
