= Quaternary (chemistry) =

Term in organic chemistry

Quaternary is a term used in organic chemistry to classify various types of compounds (e. g. amines and ammonium salts).

	Red highlighted central atoms in various groups of chemical compounds. Quaternary central atoms compared with primary, secondary and tertiary central atoms.			
	primary	secondary	tertiary	quaternary
Carbon atom in an alkane				
Alcohol				does not exist
Amine				
Amide				does not exist
Phosphine				

== See also ==
- Primary (chemistry)
- Secondary (chemistry)
- Tertiary (chemistry)
