= Primary group =

A primary group may refer to:

- In mathematics, a special kind of group:
  - a p-primary group, also called simply p-group; or
  - a primary cyclic group, which is a p-primary cyclic group.
- In sociology, a primary group as opposed to secondary group.
