= Simplexity =

Simplexity is a neologism which proposes a possible complementary relationship between complexity and simplicity.

One of the first formally published instances of the word was in the journal 'Childhood Education' (1924), in the article it appears to be used to discuss education and psychology related issues.

Simplexity was defined by computer scientists Broder and Stolfi as: "The simplexity of a problem is the maximum inefficiency among the reluctant algorithms that solve P. An algorithm is said to be pessimal for a problem P if the best-case inefficiency of A is asymptotically equal to the simplexity of P."

In 1974 Rustum Roy and Olaf Müller noted simplexity in the structure of ternary compounds: "By dealing with approximately ten ternary structural groupings we can cover the most important structures of science and technology specific to the non-metallics world. It is a remarkable instance of nature's 'simplexity'".

In 2003 Philippe Compain in an article on the future of synthetic chemistry stated: "Simplexity may be defined as the combination of simplicity and complexity within the context of a dynamic relationship between means and ends.";

Simplexity: Why Simple Things Become Complex (and How Complex Things Can Be Made Simple) by Jeffrey Kluger details ways in which simplexity theory can be applied to multiple disciplines. Kluger offers a look at simplexity at work in economics, sports, linguistics, technology, medicine and human behavior.

Simplexity has been used by Jens Nordvig to describe the particular aim of his analytics firm Exante Data: "A research product that draws on a very complex analytical foundation, but is presented in a very simple and easy to digest manner"
