= Boolean =

Mathematical topics based on the works of George Boole

Any kind of logic, function, expression, or theory based on the work of George Boole is considered Boolean.

Related to this, "Boolean" may refer to:

- Boolean data type, a form of data with only two possible values (usually "true" and "false")
- Boolean algebra, a logical calculus of truth values or set membership
- Boolean algebra (structure), a set with operations resembling logical ones
- Boolean domain, a set consisting of exactly two elements whose interpretations include false and true
- Boolean circuit, a mathematical model for digital logical circuits.
- Boolean expression, an expression in a programming language that produces a Boolean value when evaluated
- Boolean function, a function that determines Boolean values or operators
- Boolean model (probability theory), a model in stochastic geometry
- Boolean network, a certain network consisting of a set of Boolean variables whose state is determined by other variables in the network
- Boolean processor, a 1-bit variable computing unit
- Boolean ring, a mathematical ring for which x^{2} = x for every element x
- Boolean satisfiability problem, the problem of determining if there exists an interpretation that satisfies a given Boolean formula
- Boolean prime ideal theorem, a theorem which states that ideals in a Boolean algebra can be extended to prime ideals

== See also ==
- Binary (disambiguation)
