= Quaternary phase =

Chemical compound made of four elements

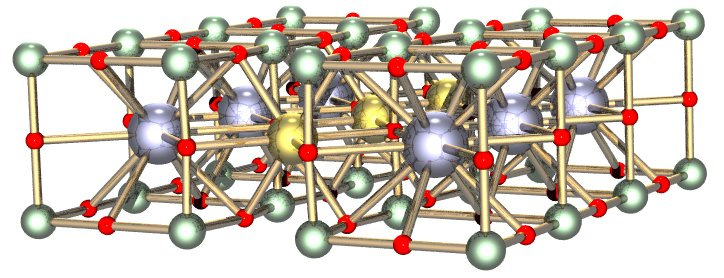
YBa_{2}Cu_{3}O_{7}, abbreviated YBCO is a famous quaternary phase. It features four elements: yttrium (Y), barium (Ba), copper (Cu), and oxygen (O).

In materials chemistry, a quaternary phase is a chemical compound containing four elements. Some compounds can be molecular or ionic, examples being chlorodifluoromethane (CHClF_{2}) and sodium bicarbonate (NaCO_{3}H). More typically quaternary phase refers to extended solids. A famous example are the yttrium barium copper oxide superconductors.

== See also ==
- Binary compound
- Ternary compound
