= Tertiary (chemistry) =

Term in organic chemistry

Tertiary is a term used in organic chemistry to classify carbon atoms in organic molecules using the number of other carbon atoms attached to it. A carbon atom, that no bonds or one bond with other carbon atoms is called "primary", with two carbon atoms- secondary, and with three-tertiary.

	Red highlighted central atoms in various groups of chemical compounds. Tertiary central atoms compared with primary, secondary and quaternary central atoms.			
	primary	secondary	tertiary	quaternary
Carbon atom in an alkane				
Alcohol				does not exist
Amine				
Amide				does not exist
Phosphine				

== See also ==
- Primary (chemistry)
- Secondary (chemistry)
- Quaternary (chemistry)
