= Ternary compound =

Chemical compound made of three different elements

In inorganic chemistry and materials chemistry, a ternary compound or ternary phase is a chemical compound containing three different elements.

While some ternary compounds are molecular, e.g. chloroform (HCCl_{3}), more typically ternary phases refer to extended solids. The perovskites are a famous example.

Binary phases, with only two elements, have lower degrees of complexity than ternary phases. With four elements, quaternary phases are more complex.

The number of isomers of a ternary compound provide a distinction between inorganic and organic chemistry: "In inorganic chemistry one or, at most, only a few compounds composed of any two or three elements were known, whereas in organic chemistry the situation was very different."

== Ternary crystalline compounds ==
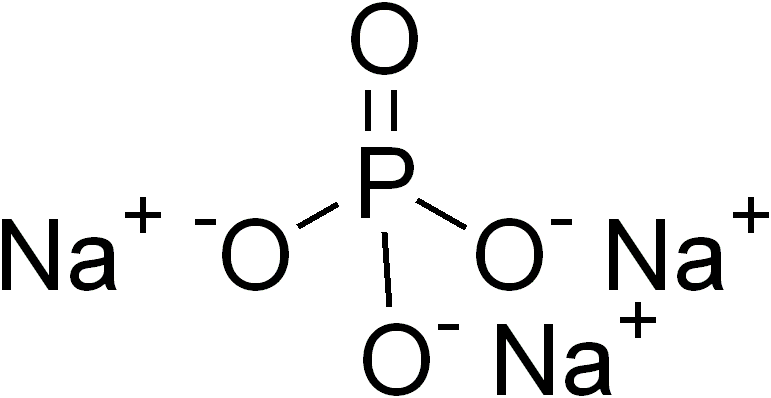
Sodium phosphate, Na_{3}PO_{4}, is a ternary compound.

An example is sodium phosphate, Na_{3}PO_{4}. The sodium ion has a charge of 1+ and the phosphate ion has a charge of 3–. Therefore, three sodium ions are needed to balance the charge of one phosphate ion. Another example of a ternary compound is calcium carbonate, CaCO_{3}. In naming and writing the formulae for ternary compounds, rules are similar to binary compounds.

=== Classifications of ternary crystals ===
According to Rustum Roy and Olaf Müller, "the chemistry of the entire mineral world informs us that chemical complexity can easily be accommodated within structural simplicity." The example of zircon is cited, where various metal atoms are replaced in the same crystal structure. "The structural entity ... remains ternary in character and is able to accommodate an enormous range of chemical elements." The great variety of ternary compounds is therefore reduced to relatively few structures: "By dealing with approximately ten ternary structural groupings we can cover the most important structures of science and technology specific to the non-metallics world. It is a remarkable instance of nature's simplexity."

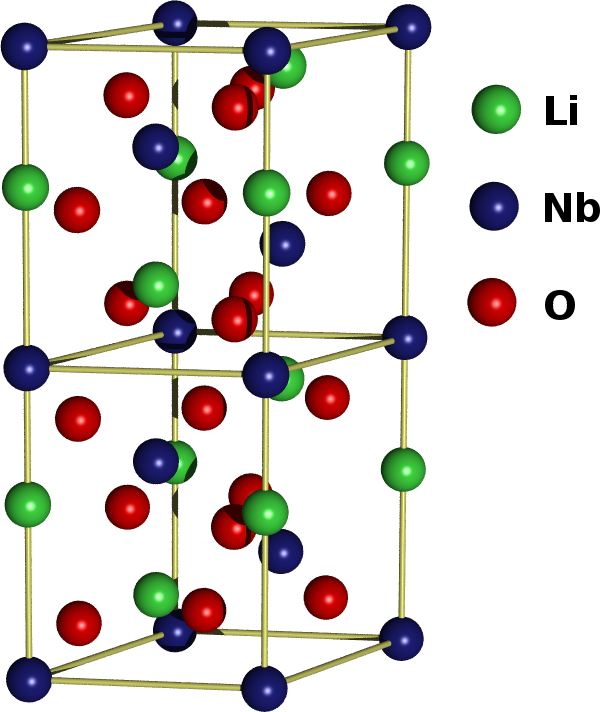
Lithium niobate is a famous ternary phase. It features three elements: Li, Nb, and O.

Letting A and B represent cations and X an anion, these ternary groupings are organized by stoichiometric types A_{2}BX_{4}, ABX_{4}, and ABX_{3}.

A ternary compound of type A_{2}BX_{4} may be in the class of olivine, the spinel group, or phenakite. Examples include K_{2}NiF_{4}, β-K_{2}SO_{4}, and CaFe_{2}O_{4}.

One of type ABX_{4} may be of the class of zircon, scheelite, barite or an ordered silicon dioxide derivative.

In the ABX_{3} class of ternary compounds, there are the structures of perovskite (structure), calcium carbonate, pyroxenes, corundum and hexagonal ABX_{2} types.

Other ternary compounds are described as crystals of types ABX_{2}, A_{2}B_{2}X_{7}, ABX_{5}, A_{2}BX_{6}, and A_{3}BX_{5}.

=== Ternary semiconductors ===
A particular class of ternary compounds are the ternary semiconductors, particularly within the III-V semiconductor family. In this type of semiconductor, the ternary can be considered to be an alloy of the two binary endpoints. Varying the composition between the endpoints allows both the lattice constant and the energy bandgap to be adjusted to produce the properties desired, for example, in emitting light (for example, as a LED) or absorbing light (as a photodetector or a photovoltaic cell). An example would be the semiconductor indium gallium arsenide (In_{x}Ga_{1−x}As), a material with band gap dependent on In/Ga ratio.

Important examples of ternary semiconductors can also be found in other semiconductor families, such as the II-VI family (e.g., Mercury cadmium telluride, Hg_{1−x}Cd_{x}Te), or the I-II-VI2 family, with examples such as CuInSe_{2}.

== Organics ==
In organic chemistry, the carbohydrates and carboxylic acids are ternary compounds with carbon, oxygen, and hydrogen. Other organic ternary compounds replace oxygen with another atom to form functional groups.

The multiplicity of ternary compounds based on {C, H, O} has been noted. For example, $\ce{C9 H10 O3}$ corresponds to more than 60 ternary compounds.

== See also ==
- Binary compound
- Mitscherlich's law of isomorphism
- Quaternary phase
