= Primary (chemistry) =

Term in organic chemistry

Primary is a term used in organic chemistry to classify various types of compounds (e.g. alcohols, alkyl halides, amines) or reactive intermediates (e.g. alkyl radicals, carbocations).

	Red highlighted central atoms in various groups of chemical compounds. Primary central atoms compared with secondary, tertiary and quaternary central atoms.			
	primary	secondary	tertiary	quaternary
Carbon atom in an alkane				
Alcohol				does not exist
Amine				
Amide				does not exist
Phosphine				

== See also ==
- Secondary (chemistry)
- Tertiary (chemistry)
- Quaternary (chemistry)
