= Secondary (chemistry) =

Term in organic chemistry

Secondary is a term used in organic chemistry to classify various types of compounds (e. g. alcohols, https://chem.libretexts.org/Bookshelves/Organic_Chemistry/Supplemental_Modules_(Organic_Chemistry)/Alcohols/Nomenclature_of_Alcohols alkyl halides, amines) or reactive intermediates (e. g. alkyl radicals, carbocations). An atom is considered secondary if it has two 'R' Groups attached to it. An 'R' group is a carbon containing group such as a methyl (CH_{3}). A secondary compound is most often classified on an alpha carbon (middle carbon) or a nitrogen. The word secondary comes from the root word 'second' which means two.

	Red highlighted central atoms in various groups of chemical compounds. Secondary central atoms compared with primary, tertiary and quaternary central atoms.			
	primary	secondary	tertiary	quaternary
Carbon atom in an alkane				

This nomenclature can be used in many cases and further used to explain relative reactivity. The reactivity of molecules varies with respect to the attached atoms. Thus, a primary, secondary, tertiary and quaternary molecule of the same function group will have different reactivities.

== Secondary alcohols ==
Secondary alcohols have the formula RCH(OH)R' where R and R' are organyl.

	Primary	Secondary	Tertiary	Quaternary
Alcohol				does not exist

== Secondary amines ==
A secondary amine has the formula RR'NH where R and R' are organyl.

	Primary	Secondary	Tertiary	Quaternary
Amine				

== Secondary amides ==
Secondary amides have the formula RC(O)NHR' where R can be H or organyl and R' is organyl. which is the loss of the single proton bonded to the middle nitrogen.

	Primary	Secondary	Tertiary	Quaternary
Amide				does not exist

== Secondary phosphines ==
Secondary phosphines have two 'R' groups attached to a phosphorus atom and again, a P-H bond.

	Primary	Secondary	Tertiary	Quaternary
Phosphine				

== Further uses ==
"Secondary" is a general term used in chemistry that can be applied to many molecules, even more than the ones listed here; the principles seen in these examples can be further applied to other functional group containing molecules. The ones shown above are common molecules seen in many organic reactions. By classifying a molecule as secondary it then be compared with a molecule of primary or tertiary nature to determine the relative reactivity.

== See also ==
- Primary (chemistry)
- Tertiary (chemistry)
- Quaternary (chemistry)
