= CJK Compatibility =

- Range: U+3300..U+33FF (256 code points)
- Plane: BMP
- Scripts: Katakana (88 char.); Common (168 char.)
- Assigned: 256 code points
- Unused: 0 reserved code points

Unicode Version History
- 1.0.0 (1991): 187 (+187)
- 1.1 (1993): 249 (+62)
- 4.0 (2003): 256 (+7)

Unicode documentation
- Code chart ∣ Web page

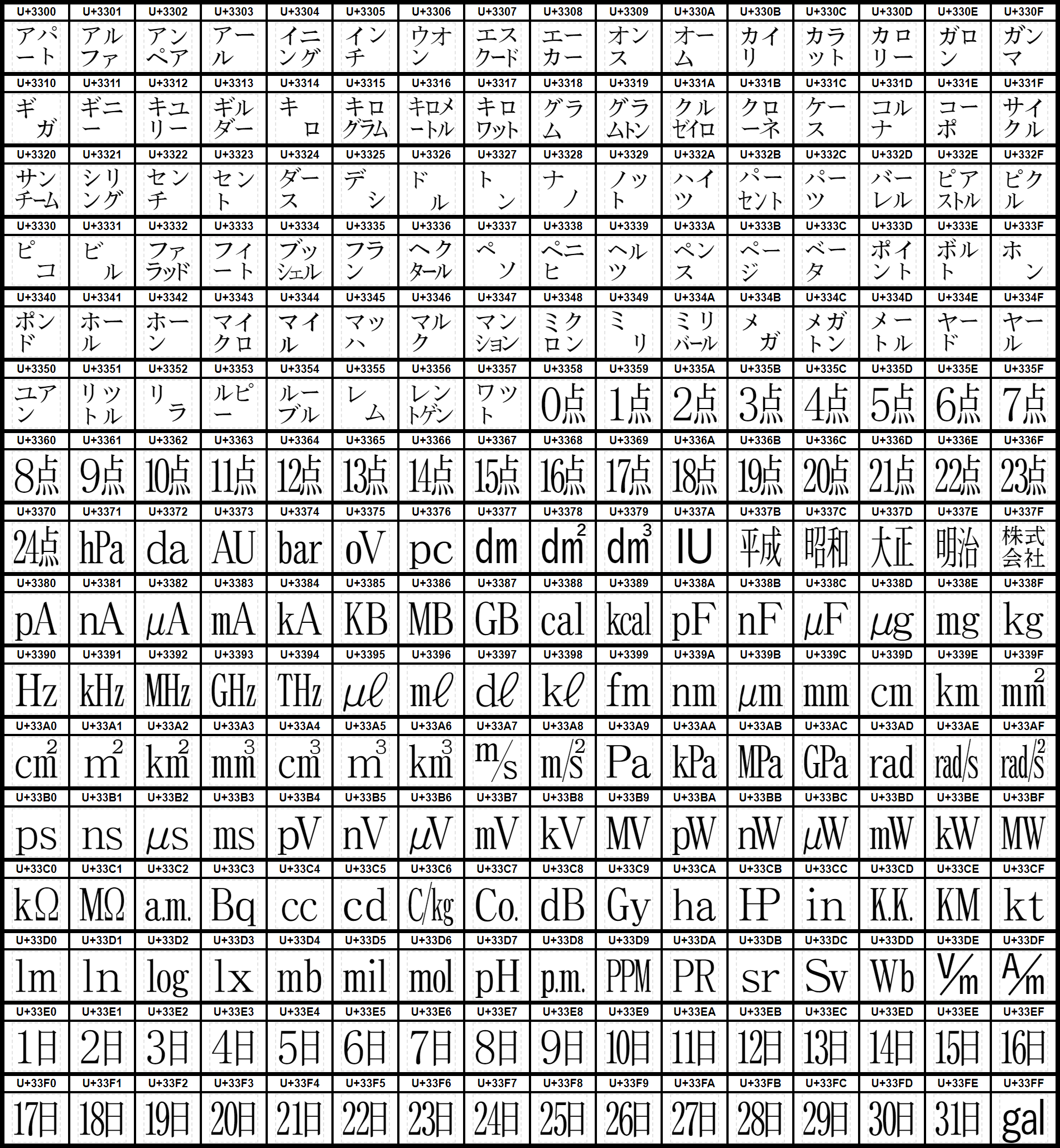
Graphical representation of the CJK Compatibility Unicode block

CJK Compatibility is a Unicode block containing square symbols (both CJK and Latin alphanumeric) encoded for compatibility with East Asian character sets. In Unicode 1.0, it was divided into two blocks, named CJK Squared Words (U+3300–U+337F) and CJK Squared Abbreviations (U+3380–U+33FF). The square forms can have different presentations when they are used in horizontal or vertical text. For example, the characters U+333E ㌾ SQUARE BORUTO (from ボルト) and U+3327 ㌧ SQUARE TON (from トン) should look different in horizontal and in vertical right-to-left: ㌧㌾

Characters U+337B through U+337E are the Japanese era calendar scheme symbols Heisei (㍻), Shōwa (㍼), Taishō (㍽) and Meiji (㍾) (also available in certain legacy sets, such as the "NEC special characters" extension for JIS X 0208, as included in Microsoft's version and later JIS X 0213). The Reiwa era symbol (U+32FF ㋿ SQUARE ERA NAME REIWA) is in Enclosed CJK Letters and Months (the CJK Compatibility block having been fully allocated by the time of its commencement).

== Block ==
CJK Compatibility^{[1]} Official Unicode Consortium code chart (PDF)
	0	1	2	3	4	5	6	7	8	9	A	B	C	D	E	F
U+330x	㌀	㌁	㌂	㌃	㌄	㌅	㌆	㌇	㌈	㌉	㌊	㌋	㌌	㌍	㌎	㌏
U+331x	㌐	㌑	㌒	㌓	㌔	㌕	㌖	㌗	㌘	㌙	㌚	㌛	㌜	㌝	㌞	㌟
U+332x	㌠	㌡	㌢	㌣	㌤	㌥	㌦	㌧	㌨	㌩	㌪	㌫	㌬	㌭	㌮	㌯
U+333x	㌰	㌱	㌲	㌳	㌴	㌵	㌶	㌷	㌸	㌹	㌺	㌻	㌼	㌽	㌾	㌿
U+334x	㍀	㍁	㍂	㍃	㍄	㍅	㍆	㍇	㍈	㍉	㍊	㍋	㍌	㍍	㍎	㍏
U+335x	㍐	㍑	㍒	㍓	㍔	㍕	㍖	㍗	㍘	㍙	㍚	㍛	㍜	㍝	㍞	㍟
U+336x	㍠	㍡	㍢	㍣	㍤	㍥	㍦	㍧	㍨	㍩	㍪	㍫	㍬	㍭	㍮	㍯
U+337x	㍰	㍱	㍲	㍳	㍴	㍵	㍶	㍷	㍸	㍹	㍺	㍻	㍼	㍽	㍾	㍿
U+338x	㎀	㎁	㎂	㎃	㎄	㎅	㎆	㎇	㎈	㎉	㎊	㎋	㎌	㎍	㎎	㎏
U+339x	㎐	㎑	㎒	㎓	㎔	㎕	㎖	㎗	㎘	㎙	㎚	㎛	㎜	㎝	㎞	㎟
U+33Ax	㎠	㎡	㎢	㎣	㎤	㎥	㎦	㎧	㎨	㎩	㎪	㎫	㎬	㎭	㎮	㎯
U+33Bx	㎰	㎱	㎲	㎳	㎴	㎵	㎶	㎷	㎸	㎹	㎺	㎻	㎼	㎽	㎾	㎿
U+33Cx	㏀	㏁	㏂	㏃	㏄	㏅	㏆	㏇	㏈	㏉	㏊	㏋	㏌	㏍	㏎	㏏
U+33Dx	㏐	㏑	㏒	㏓	㏔	㏕	㏖	㏗	㏘	㏙	㏚	㏛	㏜	㏝	㏞	㏟
U+33Ex	㏠	㏡	㏢	㏣	㏤	㏥	㏦	㏧	㏨	㏩	㏪	㏫	㏬	㏭	㏮	㏯
U+33Fx	㏰	㏱	㏲	㏳	㏴	㏵	㏶	㏷	㏸	㏹	㏺	㏻	㏼	㏽	㏾	㏿
Notes 1.As of Unicode version 18.0

== History ==
The following Unicode-related documents record the purpose and process of defining specific characters in the CJK Compatibility block:

Version	Final code points (Note: Proposed code points and characters names may differ from final code points and names)	Count	L2 ID	WG2 ID	Document
1.0.0	U+3300..3357, 337B..33DD	187			(to be determined)
1.0.0	U+3300..3357, 337B..33DD	187		N2956	Freytag, Asmus (2005-08-12), "Representative Glyph for U+33AC SQUARE GPA", Unicode Consortium Liaison Report for WG2 Meeting #47
1.0.0	U+3300..3357, 337B..33DD	187		N2953 (pdf, doc)	Umamaheswaran, V. S. (2006-02-16), "M47.16 (Miscellaneous glyph defects)", Unconfirmed minutes of WG 2 meeting 47, Sophia Antipolis, France; 2005-09-12/15
1.1	U+3358..3376, 33E0..33FE	62			(to be determined)
4.0	U+3377..337A, 33DE..33DF, 33FF	7	L2/99-353	N2056	"3", Amendment of the part concerning the Korean characters in ISO/IEC 10646-1:1998 amendment 5, 1999-07-29
4.0	U+3377..337A, 33DE..33DF, 33FF	7	L2/99-380		Proposal for a New Work item (NP) to amend the Korean part in ISO/IEC 10646-1:1993, 1999-12-07
4.0	U+3377..337A, 33DE..33DF, 33FF	7	L2/99-380.3		Annex B, Special characters compatible with KPS 9566-97 (To be extended), 1999-12-07
4.0	U+3377..337A, 33DE..33DF, 33FF	7	L2/00-084	N2182	"3", Amendment of the part concerning the Korean characters in ISO/IEC 10646-1:1998 amendment 5 (Cover page and outline of proposal L2/99-380), 1999-12-07
4.0	U+3377..337A, 33DE..33DF, 33FF	7	L2/99-382		Whistler, Ken (1999-12-09), "2.3", Comments to accompany a U.S. NO vote on JTC1 N5999, SC2 N3393, New Work item proposal (NP) for an amendment of the Korean part of ISO/IEC 10646-1:1993
4.0	U+3377..337A, 33DE..33DF, 33FF	7	L2/00-066	N2170 (pdf, doc)	"3", The technical justification of the proposal to amend the Korean character part of ISO/IEC 10646-1 (proposed addition of 79 symbolic characters), 2000-02-10
4.0	U+3377..337A, 33DE..33DF, 33FF	7	L2/00-073	N2167	Karlsson, Kent (2000-03-02), Comments on DPRK New Work Item proposal on Korean characters
4.0	U+3377..337A, 33DE..33DF, 33FF	7	L2/00-285	N2244	Proposal for the Addition of 82 Symbols to ISO/IEC 10646-1:2000, 2000-08-10
4.0	U+3377..337A, 33DE..33DF, 33FF	7	L2/00-291		Everson, Michael (2000-08-30), Comments to Korean proposals (L2/00-284 - 289)
4.0	U+3377..337A, 33DE..33DF, 33FF	7		N2282	Report of the meeting of the Korean script ad hoc group, 2000-09-21
4.0	U+3377..337A, 33DE..33DF, 33FF	7	L2/01-349	N2374R	Proposal to add of 70 symbols to ISO/IEC 10646-1:2000, 2001-09-03
4.0	U+3377..337A, 33DE..33DF, 33FF	7	L2/01-387	N2390	Kim, Kyongsok (2001-10-13), ROK's Comments about DPRK's proposal, WG2 N 2374, to add 70 symbols to ISO/IEC 10646-1:2000
4.0	U+3377..337A, 33DE..33DF, 33FF	7	L2/01-388	N2392	Kim, Kyongsok (2001-10-16), A Report of Korean Script ad hoc group meeting on Oct. 15, 2001
4.0	U+3377..337A, 33DE..33DF, 33FF	7	L2/01-420		Whistler, Ken (2001-10-30), "f. Miscellaneous symbol additions from DPRK standard", WG2 (Singapore) Resolution Consent Docket for UTC
4.0	U+3377..337A, 33DE..33DF, 33FF	7	L2/01-458	N2407	Umamaheswaran, V. S. (2001-11-16), Request to Korean ad hoc group to generate mapping tables between ROK and DPRK national standards

== See also ==
- Unicode compatibility characters
- CJK Unified Ideographs
- Katakana (Unicode block)
- Letterlike Symbols
