= Microgram =

Unit of mass

microgram
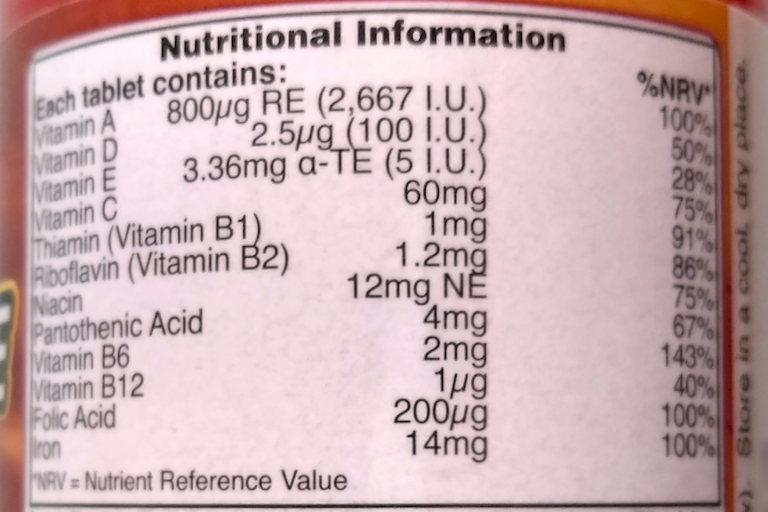
- A nutrition facts label displaying, for example, the amount of folic acid in micrograms

General information
- Unit system: SI
- Unit of: mass
- Symbol: μg

In the metric system, a microgram or microgramme is a unit of mass equal to one millionth (10^{−6}) of a gram. Two different abbreviations are commonly used. The International System of Units (SI) uses μg, where the SI prefix "micro-" is represented by the Greek letter μ (mu). The abbreviation mcg is preferred for medical information in the United States (US), but prescription writing guidance in the United Kingdom advises that "microgram" should not be abbreviated. A third abbreviation, the Greek letter γ (gamma), is no longer recommended. The US Institute for Safe Medication Practices (ISMP) and the US Food and Drug Administration (FDA) recommend that mcg should be used, rather than μg, when communicating medical information. This is due to the risk that μ might be misread as m, for "milli-", which is equal to one thousandth (10^{−3}). Such a misreading could result in a thousandfold overdose of a drug or medicine. However, mcg is also the symbol for the obsolete unit millicentigram, derived from the centimetre–gram–second system of units and equal to 10 μg.

== Typography ==
Usually, a sequence of the Unicode code point U+03BC μ GREEK SMALL LETTER MU followed by the Latin letter U+0067 g LATIN SMALL LETTER G should be used. However, if μ is not available it may be represented with U+0075 u LATIN SMALL LETTER U or the legacy Unicode symbol U+00B5 µ MICRO SIGN. In Chinese, Japanese and Korean writing a fullwidth version U+338D ㎍ SQUARE MU G should be used.

== See also ==
- List of SI prefixes
- Orders of magnitude (mass), listing a few items that have a mass of around 1 μg.
