= Unit prefix =

Indicates multiples or fractions of a unit

A unit prefix is a specifier or mnemonic that is added to the beginning of a unit of measurement to indicate multiples or fractions of the units. Units of various sizes are commonly formed by the use of such prefixes. The prefixes of the metric system, such as kilo and milli, represent multiplication by positive or negative powers of ten. In information technology it is common to use binary prefixes, which are based on powers of two. Historically, many prefixes have been used or proposed by various sources, but only a narrow set has been recognised by standards organisations.

== Metric prefixes ==
Metric prefixes in everyday use
| Prefix | Symbol | Factor | Power |
|---|---|---|---|
| tera | T | 1000000000000 | 10^{12} |
| giga | G | 1000000000 | 10^{9} |
| mega | M | 1000000 | 10^{6} |
| kilo | k | 1000 | 10^{3} |
| hecto | h | 100 | 10^{2} |
| deca | da | 10 | 10^{1} |
| (none) | (none) | 1 | 10^{0} |
| deci | d | 0.1 | 10^{−1} |
| centi | c | 0.01 | 10^{−2} |
| milli | m | 0.001 | 10^{−3} |
| micro | μ | 0.000001 | 10^{−6} |
| nano | n | 0.000000001 | 10^{−9} |
| pico | p | 0.000000000001 | 10^{−12} |

The prefixes of the metric system precede a basic unit of measure to indicate a decadic multiple and fraction of a unit. Each prefix has a unique symbol that is added to the beginning of the unit symbol. Some of the prefixes date back to the introduction of the metric system in the 1790s, but new prefixes have been added, and some have been revised. The International Bureau of Weights and Measures has standardised twenty metric prefixes in resolutions dating from 1960 to 1991 for use with the International System of Units (SI). In addition to those listed in the everyday-use table, the SI includes standardised prefixes for 10^{15} (peta), 10^{18} (exa), 10^{21} (zetta), 10^{24} (yotta), 10^{27} (ronna), and 10^{30} (quetta); and for 10^{−15} (femto), 10^{−18} (atto), 10^{−21} (zepto), 10^{−24} (yocto), 10^{−27} (ronto), and 10^{−30} (quecto).

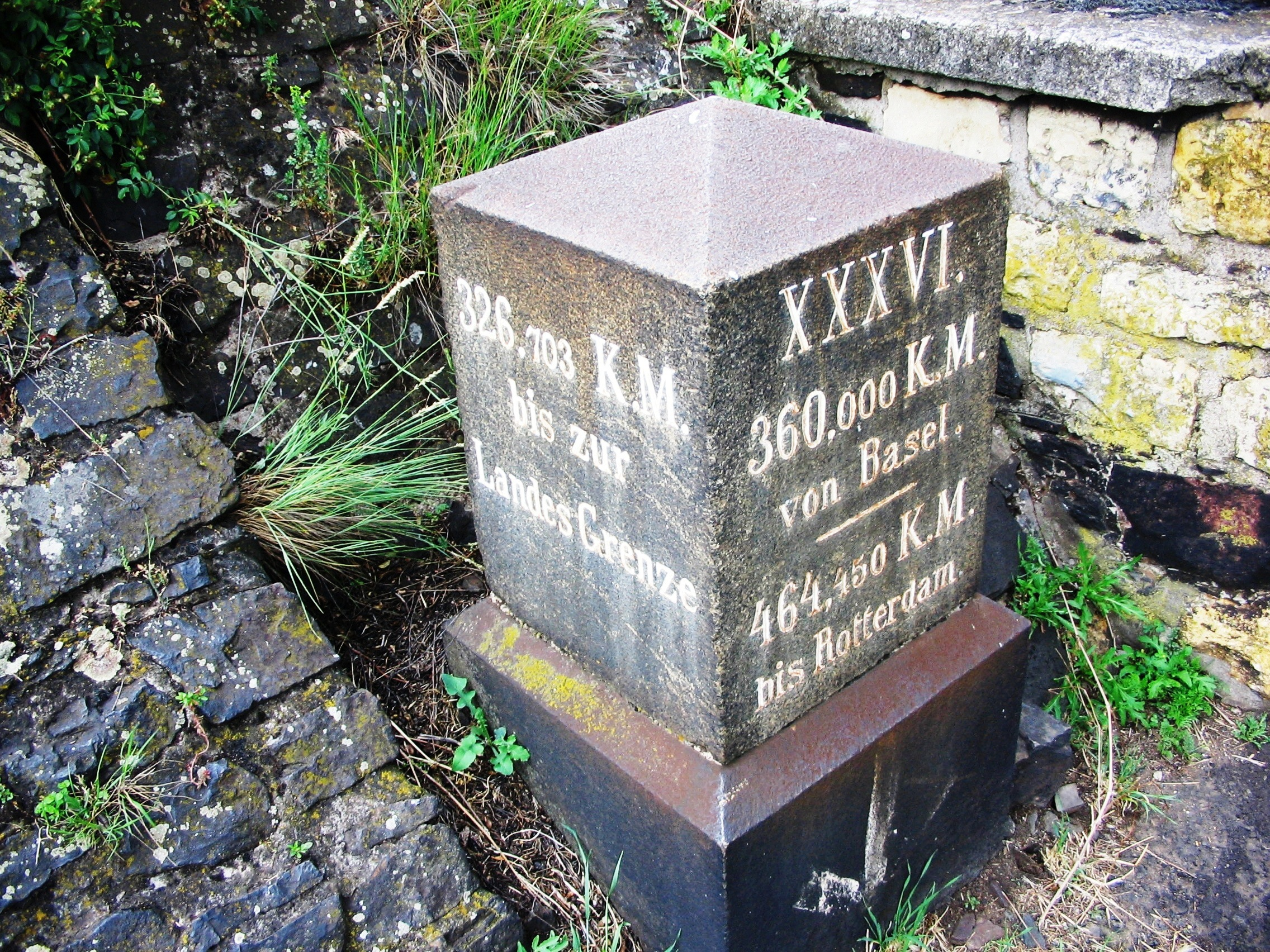
Distance marker on the Rhine: 36 (XXXVI) myriametres from Basel

Although formerly in use, the SI disallows combining prefixes; the *microkilogram or *centimillimetre, for example, are not permitted. Prefixes corresponding to powers of one thousand are usually preferred, however, units such as the hectopascal, centimetre, and centilitre, are widely used; outside the SI, the units hectare, decibel are also common. The unit prefixes are always considered to be part of the unit, so that, e.g., in exponentiation, 1 km^{2} means one square kilometre, not one thousand square metres, and 1 cm^{3} means one cubic centimetre, not one hundredth of a cubic metre.

In general, prefixes are used with any metric unit, but may also be used with non-metric units. Some combinations, however, are more common than others. The choice of prefixes for a given unit has often arisen by convenience of use and historical developments. Unit prefixes that are much larger or smaller than encountered in practice are seldom used, albeit valid combinations. In most contexts only a few, the most common, combinations are established. For example, prefixes for multiples greater than one thousand are rarely applied to the gram or metre.

Some prefixes used in older versions of the metric system are no longer used. The prefixes myria-, (from the Greek μύριοι, mýrioi), double- and demi-, denoting factors of 10000, 2 and 1/2 respectively, were parts of the original metric system adopted in France in 1795, but they were not retained when the SI prefixes were agreed internationally by the 11th CGPM conference in 1960. The prefix "myrio-" was an alternative spelling variant for "myria-", as proposed by Thomas Young.

== Binary prefixes ==
Prefixes for decimal and binary multiples
| Decimal | | | Binary | | | | |
| Value | SI | | Value | IEC | | JEDEC | |
|---|---|---|---|---|---|---|---|
| 1000 | k | kilo | 1024 | Ki | kibi | K | kilo |
| 1000^{2} | M | mega | 1024^{2} | Mi | mebi | M | mega |
| 1000^{3} | G | giga | 1024^{3} | Gi | gibi | G | giga |
| 1000^{4} | T | tera | 1024^{4} | Ti | tebi | T | tera |
| 1000^{5} | P | peta | 1024^{5} | Pi | pebi | — | |
| 1000^{6} | E | exa | 1024^{6} | Ei | exbi | — | |
| 1000^{7} | Z | zetta | 1024^{7} | Zi | zebi | — | |
| 1000^{8} | Y | yotta | 1024^{8} | Yi | yobi | — | |
| 1000^{9} | R | ronna | 1024^{9} | Ri | robi | — | |
| 1000^{10} | Q | quetta | 1024^{10} | Qi | quebi | — | |

A binary prefix indicates multiplication by a power of two. The tenth power of 2 (2^{10}) has the value 1024, which is close to 1000. This has prompted the use of the metric prefixes kilo, mega, and giga to also denote the powers of 1024 which is common in information technology with the unit of digital information, the byte.

Units of information are not covered in the International System of Units. Computer professionals have historically used the same spelling, pronunciation and symbols for the binary series in the description of computer memory, although the symbol for kilo is often capitalised. For example, in citations of main memory or RAM capacity, kilobyte, megabyte and gigabyte customarily mean 1024 (2^{10}), 1048576 (2^{20}) and 1073741824 (2^{30}) bytes respectively.

In the specifications of hard disk drive capacities and network transmission bit rates, decimal prefixes are used. For example, a 500-gigabyte hard drive holds 500 billion bytes, and a 100-megabit-per-second Ethernet connection transfers data at 100 million bits per second. The ambiguity has led to some confusion and even lawsuits from purchasers who were expecting 2^{20} or 2^{30} and considered themselves shortchanged by the seller. (see Orin Safier v. Western Digital Corporation and Cho v. Seagate Technology (US) Holdings, Inc.). To protect themselves, some sellers write out the full term as "1000000".

With the aim of avoiding ambiguity the International Electrotechnical Commission (IEC) adopted new binary prefixes in 1998 (IEC 80000-13:2008 formerly subclauses 3.8 and 3.9 of IEC 60027-2:2005). Each binary prefix is formed from the first syllable of the decimal prefix with the similar value, and the syllable "bi". The symbols are the decimal symbol, always capitalised, followed by the letter "i". According to these standards, kilo, mega, giga, et seq. should only be used in the decimal sense, even when referring to data storage capacities: kilobyte and megabyte denote one thousand and one million bytes respectively (consistent with the metric system), while terms such as kibibyte, mebibyte and gibibyte, with symbols KiB, MiB and GiB, denote 2^{10}, 2^{20} and 2^{30} bytes respectively.

== Unofficial prefixes ==
A metric prefix myria (abbreviation "my"), for 10000, was deprecated in 1960. Before the adoption of ronna and quetta for 10^{27} and 10^{30} and ronto and quecto for 10^{−27} and 10^{−30} in November 2022, many personal, and sometimes facetious, proposals for additional metric prefixes were formulated. The prefix bronto, as used in the term "brontobyte", has been used to represent anything from 10^{15} to 10^{27} bytes, most often 10^{27}. In 2010, an online petition sought to establish hella- as the SI prefix for 10^{27}, a movement that began on the campus of UC Davis. The prefix, which has since appeared in the San Francisco Chronicle, Daily Telegraph, Wired and some other scientific magazines, was recognised by Google, in a non-serious fashion, in May 2010. Ian Mills, president of the Consultative Committee on Units, considered the chances of official adoption to be remote.

The ascending prefixes peta (1000^{5}) and exa (1000^{6}) are based on the Greek-derived numeric prefixes "penta" (5) and "hexa" (6). The prefixes zetta (1000^{7}), and yotta (1000^{8}) and, similarly, the descending prefixes zepto (1000^{−7}) and yocto (1000^{−8}) are derived from Latin "septem" (7) and "octo" (8) plus the initial letters "z" and "y". The initial letters "z" and "y" appear in these SI prefixes because of previously proposed ascending hepto (Greek "hepta" (7)) was already in use as a numerical prefix (implying seven) and the letter "h" as both SI-accepted non-SI unit (hour) and prefix (hecto 10^{2}), the same applied to "s" from previously proposed descending septo (i.e. SI unit "s", seconds), while "o" for octo was problematic since a symbol "o" could be confused with zero. (Note: "The names zepto and zetta suggest the digit seven [sept] (seventh power of 10^{3}) and the letter 'z' replaces the letter 's' to avoid the duplicate use of the letter 's' as a symbol. The names yocto and yotta are derived from octo, which suggests the number eight (eighth power of 10^{3}); the letter 'y' is added to avoid the use of the letter 'o' as a symbol because of the possible confusion with the digit zero." Resolution 4 of the 19th CGPM (1991))

== See also ==
- Order of magnitude
- SI base unit
- Indian numbering system
