= Steam contamination =

Steam contamination is generally described as the decrease in the quality of steam commonly used in thermal power stations, the chemical industry, etc. It is frequently measured by the amount of sodium, silicon dioxide, and carbon dioxide dissolved in steam and expressed in μg/Kg.
