= Weka (disambiguation) =

The weka is a species of New Zealand bird.

Weka may also refer to:

- Weka (machine learning), a suite of machine learning software written at the University of Waikato
- Weka, an unofficial unit prefix
- WEKA-LD, a low-power television station (channel 26, virtual 41) licensed to serve Canton, Ohio, United States

== See also ==
- WekaFS, a clustered file system
