= Harpo =

Harpo may refer to:

- Harpo Marx, American comedian, mime artist, and musician best known as a member of the Marx Brothers
- Harpo Productions, American multimedia company founded by Oprah Winfrey ("Harpo" is "Oprah" spelled backwards)
- Harpo (singer), stage name of Jan Svensson, Swedish pop singer
- Slim Harpo, stage name of James Moore, American blues musician
- harpo- was a 1993 facetious proposal for an SI unit prefix standing for 10^{−27}
