= Hecto- =

Prefix denoting a factor of 100

Hecto (symbol: h) is a decimal unit prefix in the metric system denoting a factor of one hundred. It was adopted as a multiplier in 1795, and comes from the Greek ἑκατόν hekatón, meaning "hundred". In 19th century English it was sometimes spelled "hecato", in line with a puristic opinion by Thomas Young. Its unit symbol as an SI prefix in the International System of Units (SI) is the lower case letter h.

The prefix is rarely used in general, but has certain specific applications:

- hectopascal (hPa), in meteorology, for atmospheric pressure, the modern equivalent of the traditional millibar.
- hectolitre (hl or hL), in agriculture, for liquids (notably milk and alcoholic beverages) and bulk commodities (e.g., grain).
- hectogram (hg), in agronomy, for quantities of animal feed (hectogram/animal) and for measures of agricultural productivity (hectogram/hectare); also used in Italy abbreviated as etto, and in Canada, New Zealand and Sweden simply as 100 g, for retail sale of cold cuts and meat.
- hectometre (hm), in radio astronomy, occasionally used to indicate a radio band by wavelength
- In surveying, a square hectometre is called a hectare (ha, or 100 ares = 1 hm^{2} = 10,000 m^{2}).

== See also ==
- Metric prefix
- Numeral prefix

SI prefixes
Prefix		Base 10	Decimal	Adoption (Note: Prefixes adopted before 1960 already existed before SI. The introduction of the centimetre–gram–second system of units was in 1873.)
Name	Symbol	Base 10	Decimal	Adoption
quetta	Q	10^{30}	1000000000000000000000000000000	2022
ronna	R	10^{27}	1000000000000000000000000000	2022
yotta	Y	10^{24}	1000000000000000000000000	1991
zetta	Z	10^{21}	1000000000000000000000	1991
exa	E	10^{18}	1000000000000000000	1975
peta	P	10^{15}	1000000000000000	1975
tera	T	10^{12}	1000000000000	1960
giga	G	10^{9}	1000000000	1960
mega	M	10^{6}	1000000	1873
kilo	k	10^{3}	1000	1795
hecto	h	10^{2}	100	1795
deca	da	10^{1}	10	1795
—	—	10^{0}	1	—
deci	d	10^{−1}	0.1	1795
centi	c	10^{−2}	0.01	1795
milli	m	10^{−3}	0.001	1795
micro	μ	10^{−6}	0.000001	1873
nano	n	10^{−9}	0.000000001	1960
pico	p	10^{−12}	0.000000000001	1960
femto	f	10^{−15}	0.000000000000001	1964
atto	a	10^{−18}	0.000000000000000001	1964
zepto	z	10^{−21}	0.000000000000000000001	1991
yocto	y	10^{−24}	0.000000000000000000000001	1991
ronto	r	10^{−27}	0.000000000000000000000000001	2022
quecto	q	10^{−30}	0.000000000000000000000000000001	2022
