= Tera- =

Metric prefix

Tera- (/ˈtɛrə/; symbol T) is a metric prefix denoting a factor of a short-scale trillion or long-scale billion (10^{12} or 1000000000000). It was adopted in the International System of Units (SI) in 1960. The prefix is derived from the Greek word τέρας (téras), meaning "monster".

== Exponentiation ==
- 1 Tm^{2} means one square terametre, or the size of a 1000000000000 m × 1000000000000 m square (10^{24} m^{2}), not 1000000000000 square metres (10^{12} m^{2}).
- 1 Tm^{3} means one cubic terametre, or the size of a 1000000000000 m × 1000000000000 m × 1000000000000 m cube (10^{36} m^{3}), not 1000000000000 cubic metres (10^{12} m^{3})

== Computing ==
In computing, tera- may sometimes refer to 2^{40} (1024^{4} or 1099511627776) instead of 10^{12}, such as in data storage units like the terabyte (TB). The binary prefix tebi- (/ˈtɛbɪ-/; symbol Ti) has been adopted by the International Electrotechnical Commission (IEC) to signify 2^{40} and avoid this ambiguity. JEDEC however still uses tera- for 2^{40} in its memory standards.

== Common usage ==
=== Computing ===
- terabyte (TB): unit of digital storage used in hard disk drives and solid-state drives.
  - terabytes written (TBW), a standard for SSD reliability metrics by JEDEC.
- terabit (Tbit): common in data transmission rates.
- teraFLOPS (TFLOPS): used to describe performance in supercomputers and graphics processing units (GPUs).
  - terascale computing

=== Electromagnetism ===
- terahertz (THz): used to describe electromagnetic radiation with frequencies between microwave and infrared ranges, as in:
  - terahertz laser
  - terahertz metamaterial
  - terahertz radiation
    - terahertz spectroscopy
    - terahertz tomography
    - terahertz nondestructive evaluation

=== Energy and power ===
- terajoule (TJ): used to express energy yields of large events, such as nuclear explosions or earthquakes.
- terawatt (TW): used in measuring global electrical generation and consumption.
  - Worldwide installed solar capacity reached several terawatts in 2022.
  - Peak power of a 30-microsecond lightning strike.
- terawatt-hour (TW⋅h or TWh): common unit for large-scale electrical energy production or consumption.

== See also ==
- Binary prefix
- Order of magnitude
- RKM code

SI prefixes
Prefix		Base 10	Decimal	Adoption (Note: Prefixes adopted before 1960 already existed before SI. The introduction of the centimetre–gram–second system of units was in 1873.)
Name	Symbol	Base 10	Decimal	Adoption
quetta	Q	10^{30}	1000000000000000000000000000000	2022
ronna	R	10^{27}	1000000000000000000000000000	2022
yotta	Y	10^{24}	1000000000000000000000000	1991
zetta	Z	10^{21}	1000000000000000000000	1991
exa	E	10^{18}	1000000000000000000	1975
peta	P	10^{15}	1000000000000000	1975
tera	T	10^{12}	1000000000000	1960
giga	G	10^{9}	1000000000	1960
mega	M	10^{6}	1000000	1873
kilo	k	10^{3}	1000	1795
hecto	h	10^{2}	100	1795
deca	da	10^{1}	10	1795
—	—	10^{0}	1	—
deci	d	10^{−1}	0.1	1795
centi	c	10^{−2}	0.01	1795
milli	m	10^{−3}	0.001	1795
micro	μ	10^{−6}	0.000001	1873
nano	n	10^{−9}	0.000000001	1960
pico	p	10^{−12}	0.000000000001	1960
femto	f	10^{−15}	0.000000000000001	1964
atto	a	10^{−18}	0.000000000000000001	1964
zepto	z	10^{−21}	0.000000000000000000001	1991
yocto	y	10^{−24}	0.000000000000000000000001	1991
ronto	r	10^{−27}	0.000000000000000000000000001	2022
quecto	q	10^{−30}	0.000000000000000000000000000001	2022
