= Nano- =

SI prefix denoting 10 to the -9th power

Nano (symbol n) is a unit prefix meaning one billionth. Used primarily with the metric system, this prefix denotes a factor of 10^{−9} or 0.000000001. It is frequently encountered in science and electronics for prefixing units of time and length.

The prefix derives from the Greek νᾶνος (Latin nanus), meaning "dwarf". The General Conference on Weights and Measures (CGPM) officially endorsed the usage of nano as a standard prefix in 1960.

When used as a prefix for something other than a unit of measure (as for example in words like "nanoscience"), nano refers to nanotechnology, or means "on a scale of nanometres" (nanoscale).

== Nanometre (Nanometer) ==
Different lengths as in respect to the electromagnetic spectrum, measured by the metre and its derived scales. The nanometre is often used to express dimensions on an atomic scale and mostly in the molecular scale.

The nanometre (international spelling as used by the International Bureau of Weights and Measures; SI symbol: nm), or nanometer (American spelling), is a unit of length in the International System of Units (SI), equal to one billionth (short scale) or one thousand millionth (long scale) of a metre (0.000000001 m) and to 1000 picometres. One nanometre can be expressed in scientific notation as 1 × 10^{−9} m and as 1/1000000000 m.

X-rays have a wavelength ranging from the size of 0.01 nm to 10 nm.

Three gold atoms lined up are about one nanometer (nm) long.

Human fingernails grow at approximately one nanometer per second.

== Nanosecond ==
A nanosecond (ns) is a unit of time in the International System of Units (SI) equal to one billionth of a second, that is, 1/1000000000 of a second, or 10^{−9} seconds.

The term combines the SI prefix nano- indicating a 1 billionth submultiple of an SI unit (e.g. nanogram, nanometre, etc.) and second, the primary unit of time in the SI.

A nanosecond is to one second, as one second is to approximately 31.69 years.

A nanosecond is equal to 1000 picoseconds or 1/1000 microsecond. Time units ranging between 10^{−8} and 10^{−7} seconds are typically expressed as tens or hundreds of nanoseconds.

Time units of this granularity are commonly found in telecommunications, pulsed lasers, and related aspects of electronics.

One nanosecond (ns) is about the time required for light to travel 30 cm in air, or 20 cm in an optical fiber.

== See also ==
- RKM code

SI prefixes
Prefix		Base 10	Decimal	Adoption (Note: Prefixes adopted before 1960 already existed before SI. The introduction of the centimetre–gram–second system of units was in 1873.)
Name	Symbol	Base 10	Decimal	Adoption
quetta	Q	10^{30}	1000000000000000000000000000000	2022
ronna	R	10^{27}	1000000000000000000000000000	2022
yotta	Y	10^{24}	1000000000000000000000000	1991
zetta	Z	10^{21}	1000000000000000000000	1991
exa	E	10^{18}	1000000000000000000	1975
peta	P	10^{15}	1000000000000000	1975
tera	T	10^{12}	1000000000000	1960
giga	G	10^{9}	1000000000	1960
mega	M	10^{6}	1000000	1873
kilo	k	10^{3}	1000	1795
hecto	h	10^{2}	100	1795
deca	da	10^{1}	10	1795
—	—	10^{0}	1	—
deci	d	10^{−1}	0.1	1795
centi	c	10^{−2}	0.01	1795
milli	m	10^{−3}	0.001	1795
micro	μ	10^{−6}	0.000001	1873
nano	n	10^{−9}	0.000000001	1960
pico	p	10^{−12}	0.000000000001	1960
femto	f	10^{−15}	0.000000000000001	1964
atto	a	10^{−18}	0.000000000000000001	1964
zepto	z	10^{−21}	0.000000000000000000001	1991
yocto	y	10^{−24}	0.000000000000000000000001	1991
ronto	r	10^{−27}	0.000000000000000000000000001	2022
quecto	q	10^{−30}	0.000000000000000000000000000001	2022
