= Deca- =

Numerical prefix meaning "ten"

Deca (and dec; sometimes deka) is a common English-language numeral prefix derived from the Late Latin decas ("(set of) ten"), from Ancient Greek δεκάς (dekás), from δέκα (déka, "ten"). It is used in many words.

It is also a decimal unit prefix in the International System of Units (SI) denoting a factor of ten, with symbol da and spelled "deca" internationally (Note: As used by the International Bureau of Weights and Measures.) (or "deka" in American spelling).

== SI ==
The prefix was a part of the original metric system in 1795. It is not in very common usage, although the decapascal is occasionally used by audiologists. The decanewton is also encountered occasionally, probably because it is an SI approximation of the kilogram-force. Its use is more common in Central Europe. In German, Polish, Czech, Slovak, and Hungarian, deka (or deko) is common, and used in self-standing form, always meaning decagram. A runway number typically indicates its magnetic azimuth in decadegrees.

Before the symbol as an SI prefix was standardized as da with the introduction of the International System of Units in 1960, various other symbols were more common, such as dk (e.g., UK and Austria, still common in Hungary for decagrams), D (e.g., Germany, Eastern Europe), and Da. For syntactical reasons, the HP 48, 49, 50 series, as well as the HP 39gII and Prime calculators use the unit prefix D.

- 1 decametre = 10 metres
- 1 decalitre = 10 litres
- 1 decare = 10 ares

Examples:

- The blue whale is approximately 30 metres, or 3 decametres, in length.

== As an English prefix ==
The prefix is used in many words.

=== General ===
- Decathlon, a combined event in athletics consisting of ten track and field events.
- Decennial, ten-yearly or a celebration of ten years.

=== Mathematics ===
- Decimal based on the number ten.
- Decagon a plane figure with ten sides
- Decahedron a polyhedron with ten faces

=== Chemistry ===
- Decane, a hydrocarbon with 10 carbon atoms

=== Biology ===
- Decapoda, an order of crustaceans with ten feet

=== Religion ===
- The Decalogue, the Ten Commandments

== See also ==
- Metric prefix

== Notes ==
SI prefixes
Prefix		Base 10	Decimal	Adoption (Note: Prefixes adopted before 1960 already existed before SI. The introduction of the centimetre–gram–second system of units was in 1873.)
Name	Symbol	Base 10	Decimal	Adoption
quetta	Q	10^{30}	1000000000000000000000000000000	2022
ronna	R	10^{27}	1000000000000000000000000000	2022
yotta	Y	10^{24}	1000000000000000000000000	1991
zetta	Z	10^{21}	1000000000000000000000	1991
exa	E	10^{18}	1000000000000000000	1975
peta	P	10^{15}	1000000000000000	1975
tera	T	10^{12}	1000000000000	1960
giga	G	10^{9}	1000000000	1960
mega	M	10^{6}	1000000	1873
kilo	k	10^{3}	1000	1795
hecto	h	10^{2}	100	1795
deca	da	10^{1}	10	1795
—	—	10^{0}	1	—
deci	d	10^{−1}	0.1	1795
centi	c	10^{−2}	0.01	1795
milli	m	10^{−3}	0.001	1795
micro	μ	10^{−6}	0.000001	1873
nano	n	10^{−9}	0.000000001	1960
pico	p	10^{−12}	0.000000000001	1960
femto	f	10^{−15}	0.000000000000001	1964
atto	a	10^{−18}	0.000000000000000001	1964
zepto	z	10^{−21}	0.000000000000000000001	1991
yocto	y	10^{−24}	0.000000000000000000000001	1991
ronto	r	10^{−27}	0.000000000000000000000000001	2022
quecto	q	10^{−30}	0.000000000000000000000000000001	2022
