= Metric prefix =

Order of magnitude indicator

A metric prefix is a unit prefix that precedes a basic unit of measure to indicate a multiple or submultiple of the unit. All metric prefixes used today are decimal. Each prefix has a unique symbol that is prepended to any unit symbol. The prefix kilo, for example, may be added to gram to indicate multiplication by one thousand: one kilogram is equal to one thousand grams. The prefix milli, likewise, may be added to metre to indicate division by one thousand, so one millimetre is equal to one thousandth of a metre.

Decimal multiplicative prefixes have been a feature of all forms of the metric system, with six of these dating back to the system's introduction in the 1790s. Metric prefixes have also been used with some non-metric units. The SI prefixes are metric prefixes that were standardised for use in the International System of Units (SI) by the International Bureau of Weights and Measures (BIPM) in resolutions dating from 1960 to 2022. Since 2009, they have formed part of the ISO/IEC 80000 standard. They are also used in the Unified Code for Units of Measure (UCUM).

== List of SI prefixes ==
The BIPM specifies twenty-four prefixes for the International System of Units (SI).

SI prefixes
Prefix		Base 10	Decimal	Adoption (Note: Prefixes adopted before 1960 already existed before SI. The introduction of the centimetre–gram–second system of units was in 1873.)
Name	Symbol	Base 10	Decimal	Adoption
quetta	Q	10^{30}	1000000000000000000000000000000	2022
ronna	R	10^{27}	1000000000000000000000000000	2022
yotta	Y	10^{24}	1000000000000000000000000	1991
zetta	Z	10^{21}	1000000000000000000000	1991
exa	E	10^{18}	1000000000000000000	1975
peta	P	10^{15}	1000000000000000	1975
tera	T	10^{12}	1000000000000	1960
giga	G	10^{9}	1000000000	1960
mega	M	10^{6}	1000000	1873
kilo	k	10^{3}	1000	1795
hecto	h	10^{2}	100	1795
deca	da	10^{1}	10	1795
—	—	10^{0}	1	—
deci	d	10^{−1}	0.1	1795
centi	c	10^{−2}	0.01	1795
milli	m	10^{−3}	0.001	1795
micro	μ	10^{−6}	0.000001	1873
nano	n	10^{−9}	0.000000001	1960
pico	p	10^{−12}	0.000000000001	1960
femto	f	10^{−15}	0.000000000000001	1964
atto	a	10^{−18}	0.000000000000000001	1964
zepto	z	10^{−21}	0.000000000000000000001	1991
yocto	y	10^{−24}	0.000000000000000000000001	1991
ronto	r	10^{−27}	0.000000000000000000000000001	2022
quecto	q	10^{−30}	0.000000000000000000000000000001	2022
Notes

The first uses of prefixes in SI date back to the definition of kilogram after the French Revolution at the end of the 18th century. Several more prefixes came into use, and were recognised by the 1947 IUPAC 14th International Conference of Chemistry before being officially adopted for the first time in 1960.

The prefixes that were most recently adopted are ronna, quetta, ronto, and quecto. These prefixes were adopted in 2022, after a proposal from British metrologist Richard J. C. Brown. Before 2022, Q/q and R/r were the only Latin letters available for abbreviations, with all other Latin letters either being: already used for other prefixes (a, c, d, E, f, G, h, k, M, m, n, P, p, T, Y, y, Z, z); already used for SI units (including: SI base units, SI derived units, non-SI units mentioned in the SI; A, B, C, d, F, g, H, h, J, K, L, m, N, S, s, T, t, u, V, W); easily confused with mathematical symbols (I and l are easily confused with 1, O and o are easily confused with 0, X and x are easily confused with ×); or a combination (some symbols are used for both, e.g. metre and milli- both use m). The large prefixes ronna and quetta were adopted in anticipation of needs for use in data science, and because unofficial prefixes that did not meet SI requirements were already circulating. The small prefixes were also added, even without such a driver, in order to maintain symmetry.

The prefixes from peta to quetta are based on the Ancient Greek or Ancient Latin numbers from 5 to 10, referring to the 5th through 10th powers of 10^{3}. The initial letter h has been removed from some of these stems and the initial letters z, y, r, and q have been added, ascending in reverse alphabetical order, to avoid confusion with other metric prefixes.

=== Rules ===
- The symbols for the units of measure are combined with the symbols for each prefix name. The SI symbols for kilometre, kilogram, and kilowatt, for instance, are km, kg, and kW, respectively. (The symbol for kilo is k.) Except for the early prefixes of kilo, hecto, and deca, the symbols for the prefixes for multiples are uppercase letters, and those for the prefixes for submultiples are lowercase letters.
- All of the metric prefix symbols are made from upper- and lower-case Latin letters except for the symbol for micro, which is uniquely a Greek letter mu (μ).
- The prefix symbols are always prepended to the symbol for the unit without any intervening space or punctuation. This distinguishes a prefixed unit symbol from the product of unit symbols, for which a space or mid-height dot as separator is required. So, for instance, while 'ms' means millisecond, 'm s' or 'm·s' means metre-second.
- Prefixes corresponding to an integer power of one thousand are generally preferred; the prefixes corresponding to tens (deci-, deca-) and hundreds (centi-, hecto-) are less common and are disfavoured in certain fields. Hence, 100 m is preferred over 1 hm (hectometre) or 10 dam (decametres). The prefixes deci- and centi-, and less frequently hecto and deca, are generally used for informal purposes; the centimetre (cm) is especially common. Some modern building codes require that the millimetre be used in preference to the centimetre, because "use of centimetres leads to extensive usage of decimal points and confusion". These prefixes are also commonly used to create metric units corresponding to older conventional units, for example hectares and hectopascals.
- Prefixes may not be used in combination on a single symbol. This includes the case of the base unit kilogram, which already contains a prefix. For example, milligram (mg) is used instead of microkilogram (μkg).
- During mathematical operations, prefixes are treated as multiplicative factors. For example, 5 km is treated as 5000 m, which allows all quantities based on the same unit to be factored together even if they have different prefixes.
- A prefix symbol attached to a unit symbol is included when the unit is raised to a power. For example, 1 km^{2} denotes 1 km × 1 km = 10^{6} m^{2}, not 10^{3} m^{2}.

== Usage ==
=== Examples ===
- The mass of an electron is about 1 rg (rontogram). (Note: m_{e} = 9.1093837139(28)×10^{−31} kg. Converting to grams gives 9.1093837015×10^{−28} g. Rounding to the nearest power of ten gives 1×10^{−27} g, or 1 rg.)
- The mass of 1 litre of water is about 1 kg (kilogram).
- The mass of the Earth is about 6 Rg (ronnagrams).
- The mass of Jupiter is about 2 Qg (quettagrams).

=== Examples of powers of units with metric prefixes ===
- 1 km^{2} means one square kilometre, or the area of a square of 1000 m by 1000 m. In other words, an area of 1000000 square metres and not 1000 square metres.
- 2 Mm^{3} means two cubic megametres, or the volume of two cubes of 1000000 m by 1000000 m by 1000000 m, i.e. 2×10^{18} m^{3}, and not 2000000 cubic metres (2×10^{6} m^{3}).

=== Examples with prefixes and powers ===
- 5 mV × 5 mA = 5×10^{−3} V × 5×10^{−3} A = 25×10^{−6} V⋅A = 25 μW.
- 5.00 mV + 10 μV = 5.00 mV + 0.01 mV = 5.01 mV.
- 5 cm = 5×10^{−2} m = 5 × 0.01 m = 0.05 m.
- 9 km^{2} = 9 × (10^{3} m)^{2} = 9 × (10^{3})^{2} × m^{2} = 9×10^{6} m^{2} = 9 × 1000000 m^{2} = 9000000 m^{2}.
- 3 MW = 3×10^{6} W = 3 × 1000000 W = 3000000 W.

== Application to units of measurement ==
The use of prefixes can be traced back to the introduction of the metric system in the 1790s, long before the 1960 introduction of the SI. The prefixes, including those introduced after 1960, are used with any metric unit, whether officially included in the SI or not (e.g., millidyne and milligauss). Metric prefixes may also be used with some non-metric units, but not, for example, with the non-SI units of time.

=== Metric units ===
==== Mass ====
The units kilogram, gram, milligram, microgram, and smaller are commonly used for measurement of mass. However, megagram, gigagram, and larger are rarely used; tonnes (and kilotonnes, megatonnes, etc.) or scientific notation are used instead. The megagram does not share the risk of confusion that the tonne has with other units with the name "ton".

The kilogram is the only coherent unit of the International System of Units that includes a metric prefix.

==== Volume ====
The litre (equal to a cubic decimetre), millilitre (equal to a cubic centimetre), microlitre, and smaller are common. In Europe, the millilitre and centilitre are often used for liquids (e.g. bottles or servings of wine), and the decilitre is used less frequently. Bulk agricultural products, such as grain, beer and wine, often use the hectolitre (100 litres).

Larger volumes are usually denoted in kilolitres, megalitres or gigalitres, or else in cubic metres (1 cubic metre = 1 kilolitre) or cubic kilometres (1 cubic kilometre = 1 teralitre). For scientific (other than medical) purposes, the SI unit of cubic metre is usually used, with scientific notation rather than prefixes.

==== Length ====
The kilometre, metre, centimetre, millimetre, and smaller units are common. The decimetre is rarely used. The micrometre is often referred to by the older non-SI name micron, which is officially deprecated. In some fields, such as chemistry, the ångström (0.1 nm) has been used commonly instead of the nanometre. The femtometre, used mainly in particle physics, is sometimes called a fermi. For large scales, megametre, gigametre, and larger are rarely used. Instead, ad hoc non-metric units are used, such as the solar radius, astronomical units, light years, and parsecs, and less commonly large multiples (e.g. millions) of kilometres.

==== Time ====
Prefixes for the SI standard unit second are most commonly encountered for quantities less than one second. For larger quantities, minutes (60 seconds), hours (60 minutes) and days (24 hours) are mentioned in the SI Brochure as widely used non-SI units. When speaking of spans of time, the length of the day is usually standardised to 86400 seconds so as not to create issues with the irregular leap second.

Larger multiples of the second such as kiloseconds and megaseconds are occasionally encountered in scientific contexts, but are seldom used in common parlance. For long-scale scientific work, particularly in astronomy, the Julian year or annum (a) is a standardised variant of the year, equal to exactly 31557600 seconds (365 1 /4 days). The unit is so named because it was the average length of a year in the Julian calendar. Long time periods are then expressed by using metric prefixes with the annum, such as megaannum (Ma) or gigaannum (Ga).

==== Angle ====
The SI unit of angle is the radian, but degrees, as well as arc-minutes and arc-seconds, see some scientific use in fields such as astronomy.

==== Temperature ====
Common practice does not typically use the flexibility allowed by official policy in the case of the degree Celsius (°C). NIST states: "Prefix symbols may be used with the unit symbol °C and prefix names may be used with the unit name degree Celsius. For example, 12 m°C (12 millidegrees Celsius) is acceptable." In practice, it is more common for prefixes to be used with the kelvin when it is desirable to denote extremely large or small absolute temperatures or temperature differences. Thus, temperatures of star interiors may be given with the unit of MK (megakelvin), and molecular cooling may be given with the unit mK (millikelvin).

==== Energy ====
In use the joule and kilojoule are common, with larger multiples seen in limited contexts. In addition, the kilowatt-hour, a composite unit formed from the kilowatt and hour, is often used for electrical energy; other multiples can be formed by modifying the prefix of watt (e.g. terawatt-hour).

Several definitions exist for the non-SI unit calorie. Distinguished are gram calories and kilogram calories. One kilogram calorie, which equals one thousand gram calories, often appears capitalised and without a prefix (i.e. Cal) when referring to "dietary calories" in food. It is common to apply metric prefixes to the gram calorie, but not to the kilogram calorie: thus, 1 kcal = 1000 cal = 1 Cal.

=== Non-metric units ===
Metric prefixes are widely used outside the metric SI system. Common examples include the megabyte and the decibel. Metric prefixes rarely appear with imperial or US units except in some special cases (e.g., microinch, kilofoot, kilopound). They are also used with other specialised units used in particular fields (e.g., megaelectronvolt, gigaparsec, millibarn, kilodalton). In astronomy, geology, and palaeontology, the year, with symbol 'a' (from the Latin annus), is commonly used with metric prefixes: ka, Ma, and Ga.

Official policies about the use of SI prefixes with non-SI units vary slightly between the International Bureau of Weights and Measures (BIPM) and the American National Institute of Standards and Technology (NIST). For instance, the NIST advises that "to avoid confusion, prefix symbols (and prefix names) are not used with the time-related unit symbols (names) min (minute), h (hour), d (day); nor with the angle-related symbols (names) ° (degree), ' (minute), and ″ (second)," whereas the BIPM adds information about the use of prefixes with the symbol as for arcsecond when they state: "However astronomers use milliarcsecond, which they denote mas, and microarcsecond, μas, which they use as units for measuring very small angles."

== Non-standard prefixes ==
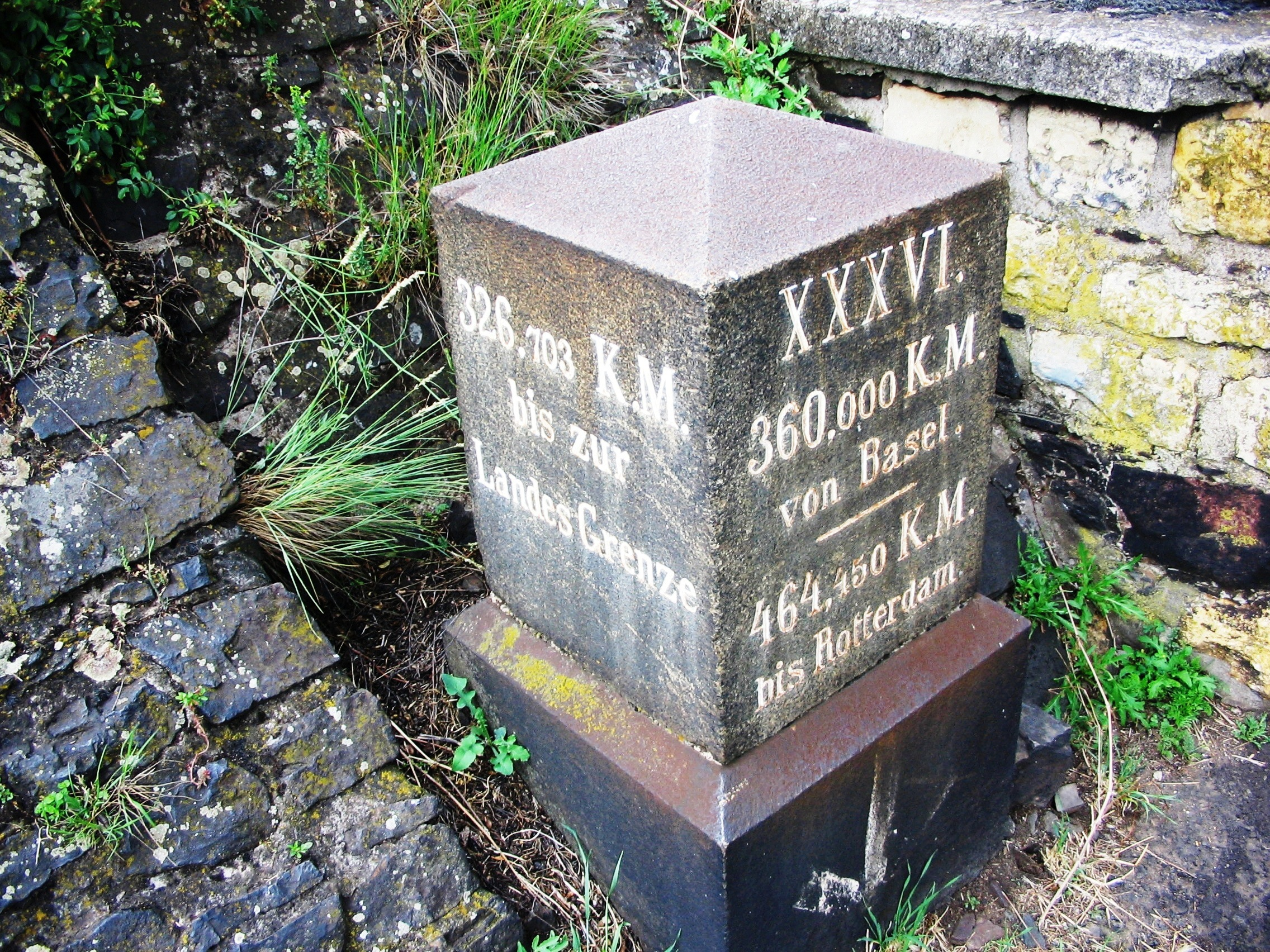
Distance marker on the Rhine at Rüdesheim: 36 (XXXVI) myriametres from Basel. The stated distance is 360 km; the decimal mark in German is a comma.

=== Obsolete metric prefixes ===
Some of the prefixes formerly used in the metric system have fallen into disuse and were not adopted into the SI. The decimal prefix for ten thousand, myria- (sometimes spelt myrio-), and the early binary prefixes double- (2×) and demi- (1/2×) were parts of the original metric system adopted by France in 1795, (Note: "Art. 8. Dans les poids et mesures de capacité, chacune des mesures décimales de ces deux genres aura son double et sa moitié, afin de donner à la vente des divers objets toute la commodité que l'on peut désirer. Il y aura donc le double-litre et le demi-litre, le double-hectogramme et le demi-hectogramme, et ainsi des autres." ("Art. 8. In the weights and measures of capacity, each of the decimal measures of these two kinds will have its double and its half, in order to give to the sale of the various articles all the convenience that one can desire. There will therefore be the double-litre and the half-litre, the double-hectogram and the half-hectogram, and so on.")) but were not retained when the SI prefixes were internationally adopted by the 11th CGPM conference in 1960.

Other metric prefixes used historically include hebdo- (10^{7}) and micri- (10^{−14}).

=== Double prefixes ===
Double prefixes have been used in the past, such as micromillimetres or millimicrons (now nanometres), micromicrofarads (μμF; now picofarads, pF), kilomegatonnes (now gigatonnes), hectokilometres (now 100 kilometres) and the derived adjective hectokilometric (typically used for qualifying the fuel consumption measures). These are not compatible with the SI.

Other obsolete double prefixes included "decimilli-" (10^{−4}), which was contracted to "dimi-" and standardised in France up to 1961.

There are no more letters of the Latin alphabet available for new prefixes (all the unused letters are already used for units). As such, Richard J. C. Brown (who proposed the prefixes adopted for 10^{±27} and 10^{±30}) has proposed a reintroduction of compound prefixes (e.g. kiloquetta- for 10^{33}) if a driver for prefixes at such scales ever materialises, with a restriction that the last prefix must always be quetta- or quecto-. This usage has not been approved by the BIPM.

== Similar symbols and abbreviations ==
In written English, the symbol K is often used informally to indicate a multiple of thousand in many contexts. For example, one may talk of a 40K salary (40000), or call the Year 2000 problem the Y2K problem. In these cases, an uppercase K is often used with an implied unit (although it could then be confused with the symbol for the kelvin temperature unit if the context is unclear). This informal postfix is read or spoken as "thousand", "grand", or just "k".

The financial and general news media mostly use m or M, b or B, and t or T as abbreviations for million, billion (10^{9}) and trillion (10^{12}), respectively, for large quantities, typically currency and population.

The medical and automotive fields in the United States use the abbreviations cc or ccm for cubic centimetres. One cubic centimetre is equal to one millilitre.

For nearly a century, engineers used the abbreviation MCM to designate a "thousand circular mils" in specifying the cross-sectional area of large electrical cables. Since the mid-1990s, kcmil has been adopted as the official designation of a thousand circular mils, but the designation MCM still remains in wide use. A similar system is used in natural gas sales in the United States: m (or M) for thousands and mm (or MM) for millions (thousand thousands) of British thermal units or therms, and in the oil industry, where MMbbl is the symbol for "millions of barrels". These usages of the capital letter M for "thousand" in MCM is from Roman numerals, in which M means 1000.

== Typography ==
=== Micro symbol ===
When the prefixes mega- and micro- were adopted in 1873, it was necessary to use a symbol other than upper and lowercase M to distinguish the prefixes. Eventually the Greek letter mu (μ) was adopted.

With the lack of a ⟨μ⟩ key on most typewriters, as well as computer keyboards, various other abbreviations remained common, including "mc", "mic", "M", and "u".

From about 1960 onwards, "u" prevailed in type-written documents. (Note: Sometimes the symbol 'u' is marked by adding a downstroke using a pen or pencil, or a slash '/u'.) Because ASCII, EBCDIC, and other common encodings lacked code-points for ⟨μ⟩, this tradition remained even as computers replaced typewriters.

The standard ISO 8859-1 included the ⟨μ⟩ symbol for micro- at the codepoint 0xB5. The whole of ISO 8859-1 was incorporated into Unicode, which lists the Greek letter at U+03BC. Many fonts that support both characters (micro sign and lowercase mu) render them identically, but because the micro sign and the Greek lower-case letter have different applications (0xB5 is not used in Greek text), some fonts render them differently, e.g. Linux Libertine and Segoe UI.

=== Keyboard entry ===
Most English-language keyboards do not have a ⟨μ⟩ key, so it is necessary to use a key-code; this varies depending on the operating system, physical keyboard layout, and user's language.

On Microsoft Windows systems:

- Arbitrary Unicode codepoints can be entered in decimal with: Alt sustained, 0 1 8 1, and releasing Alt. A leading "0" is required (this registers as the corresponding Unicode hexadecimal code-point, 0xB5 is equal to 181), or
- Arbitrary Unicode codepoints can be entered in hexadecimal as: Alt+++b+5 (up to 5 hexadecimal characters, not counting the leading '+', upper or lower case), or
- In the tradition of MS-DOS, IBM code page 437 one can also enter old code-points in decimal: Alt 2 3 0 (the leading zero must be omitted);

On MacOS systems, code-point U+00B5 can be entered as either ⌥ Opt+m or ⌥ Opt+Y.

On Linux systems:

- Under X11, when a Compose key has been enabled: Compose+m+u
- Under X11, with ibus version 1.5.19 (or higher) active, and a non-composing input method selected: The default keybinding for starting codepoint input is Ctrl+⇧ Shift+u. The key sequence Ctrl+⇧ Shift+u b 5 space then produces the micro sign (U+00B5).
- On the VGA console's virtual terminals, arbitrary Unicode codepoints can be entered in decimal as: Alt sustained, 1 8 1, and releasing Alt. A leading "0" is not required.
- The code-point U+00B5 can be entered as right Alt+m (provided the right alt key is configured to act as AltGr).

=== Typesetting in LaTeX ===
The LaTeX typesetting system features an SIunitx package in which the units of measurement are spelled out, for example, \qty{3}{\tera\hertz} formats as "3 THz".

== See also ==
- Binary prefix – Prefix indicating a power of two
- CJK Compatibility – Unicode block including precomposed unit symbols with prefixes, such as U+3371 ㍱ SQUARE HPA
- E1 series (preferred numbers) – Series of preferred values for passive electrical components
- Engineering notation – Version of scientific notation
- Indian numbering system – Indian convention of naming large numbers
- International vocabulary of metrology – Standards organisation in France
- ISO/IEC 80000 – International standard on physical quantities and units of measurement
- Numeral prefix – Prefix derived from numerals or other numbers
- Order of magnitude – Scale of numbers with a fixed ratio
- Orders of magnitude (data) – Computer data measurements and scales
- RKM code – Notation to specify resistor and capacitor values
- Unified Code for Units of Measure – System of codes for unambiguously representing measurement units
