= Kilo- =

Decimal unit prefix in the metric system

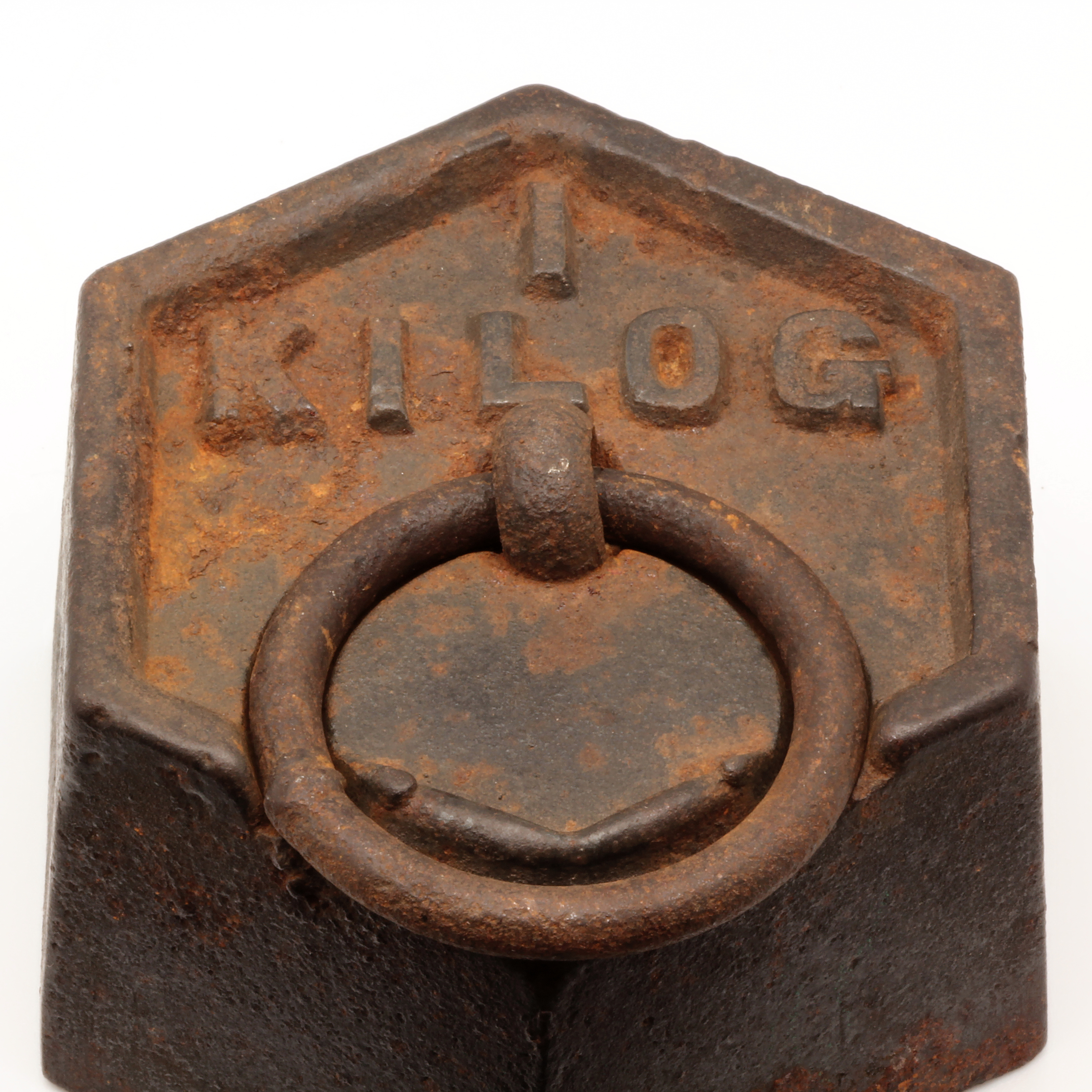
Antique 1 kilogram weight

Kilo is a unit prefix in the metric system of measurement, denoting multiplication by one thousand (10^{3}). The International System of Units reserves the lowercase symbol k.

Kilo is derived from the Greek word χίλιοι (chilioi), meaning "thousand".

In 19th century English the prefix was sometimes spelled chilio, in line with a puristic opinion by Thomas Young. As an opponent of suggestions to introduce the metric system in Britain, he qualified the nomenclature adopted in France as barbarous.

== Examples ==
- one kilogram (kg) is 1000 grams
- one kilometre (km) is 1000 metres
- one kilojoule (kJ) is 1000 joules
- one kilolitre (kL) is 1000 litres
- one kilobaud (kBd) is 1000 bauds
- one kilohertz (kHz) is 1000 hertz
- one kilodalton (kDa) is 1000 daltons
- one kilobit (kb) is 1000 bits
- one kilobyte (kB) is 1000 bytes
- one kiloohm is (kΩ) is 1000 ohms
- one kilosecond (ks) is 1000 seconds
- one kilotonne (kt) is 1000 tonnes

By extension, currencies are sometimes also preceded by the prefix:

- one kiloeuro (k€) is 1000 euros
- one kilodollar (k$) is 1000 dollars

== kilobyte ==
For multiples of the byte in some fields of computer science and information technology, another definition has been in common use, in which the kilobyte measures 1024 bytes (2^{10} bytes), because 2^{10} is approximately 10^{3}. The reason for this application is that digital hardware natively use base 2 exponentiation.

The National Institute of Standards and Technology (NIST) comments on the confusion caused by these contrasting definitions: "Faced with this reality, the IEEE Standards Board decided that IEEE standards will use the conventional, internationally adopted, definitions of the SI prefixes." A new set of binary prefixes, based on powers of 2, was introduced by the International Electrotechnical Commission (IEC), which defines 1024 bytes as one kibibyte (1 KiB).

== Exponentiation ==
When units occur in exponentiation, such as in square and cubic forms, any multiplier prefix is part of the unit, and thus included in the exponentiation.

- 1 km^{2} means one square kilometre or the area of a square that measures 1000 m on each side or 10^{6} m^{2} (as opposed to 1000 square meters, which is the area of a square that measures 31.6 m on each side).
- 1 km^{3} means one cubic kilometre or the volume of a cube that measures 1000 m on each side or 10^{9} m^{3} (as opposed to 1000 cubic meters, which is the volume of a cube that measures 10 m on each side).

== See also ==
- milli (inverse of kilo, denoting a factor of 1/1000)
- kibi (binary prefix, denoting a factor of 1024)
- RKM code

SI prefixes
Prefix		Base 10	Decimal	Adoption (Note: Prefixes adopted before 1960 already existed before SI. The introduction of the centimetre–gram–second system of units was in 1873.)
Name	Symbol	Base 10	Decimal	Adoption
quetta	Q	10^{30}	1000000000000000000000000000000	2022
ronna	R	10^{27}	1000000000000000000000000000	2022
yotta	Y	10^{24}	1000000000000000000000000	1991
zetta	Z	10^{21}	1000000000000000000000	1991
exa	E	10^{18}	1000000000000000000	1975
peta	P	10^{15}	1000000000000000	1975
tera	T	10^{12}	1000000000000	1960
giga	G	10^{9}	1000000000	1960
mega	M	10^{6}	1000000	1873
kilo	k	10^{3}	1000	1795
hecto	h	10^{2}	100	1795
deca	da	10^{1}	10	1795
—	—	10^{0}	1	—
deci	d	10^{−1}	0.1	1795
centi	c	10^{−2}	0.01	1795
milli	m	10^{−3}	0.001	1795
micro	μ	10^{−6}	0.000001	1873
nano	n	10^{−9}	0.000000001	1960
pico	p	10^{−12}	0.000000000001	1960
femto	f	10^{−15}	0.000000000000001	1964
atto	a	10^{−18}	0.000000000000000001	1964
zepto	z	10^{−21}	0.000000000000000000001	1991
yocto	y	10^{−24}	0.000000000000000000000001	1991
ronto	r	10^{−27}	0.000000000000000000000000001	2022
quecto	q	10^{−30}	0.000000000000000000000000000001	2022
