= Micro- =

Metric system unit prefix, one millionth

μo

Micro-
- In Unicode: U+03BC μ GREEK SMALL LETTER MU

Different from
- Different from: U+00B5 µ MICRO SIGN (discouraged)

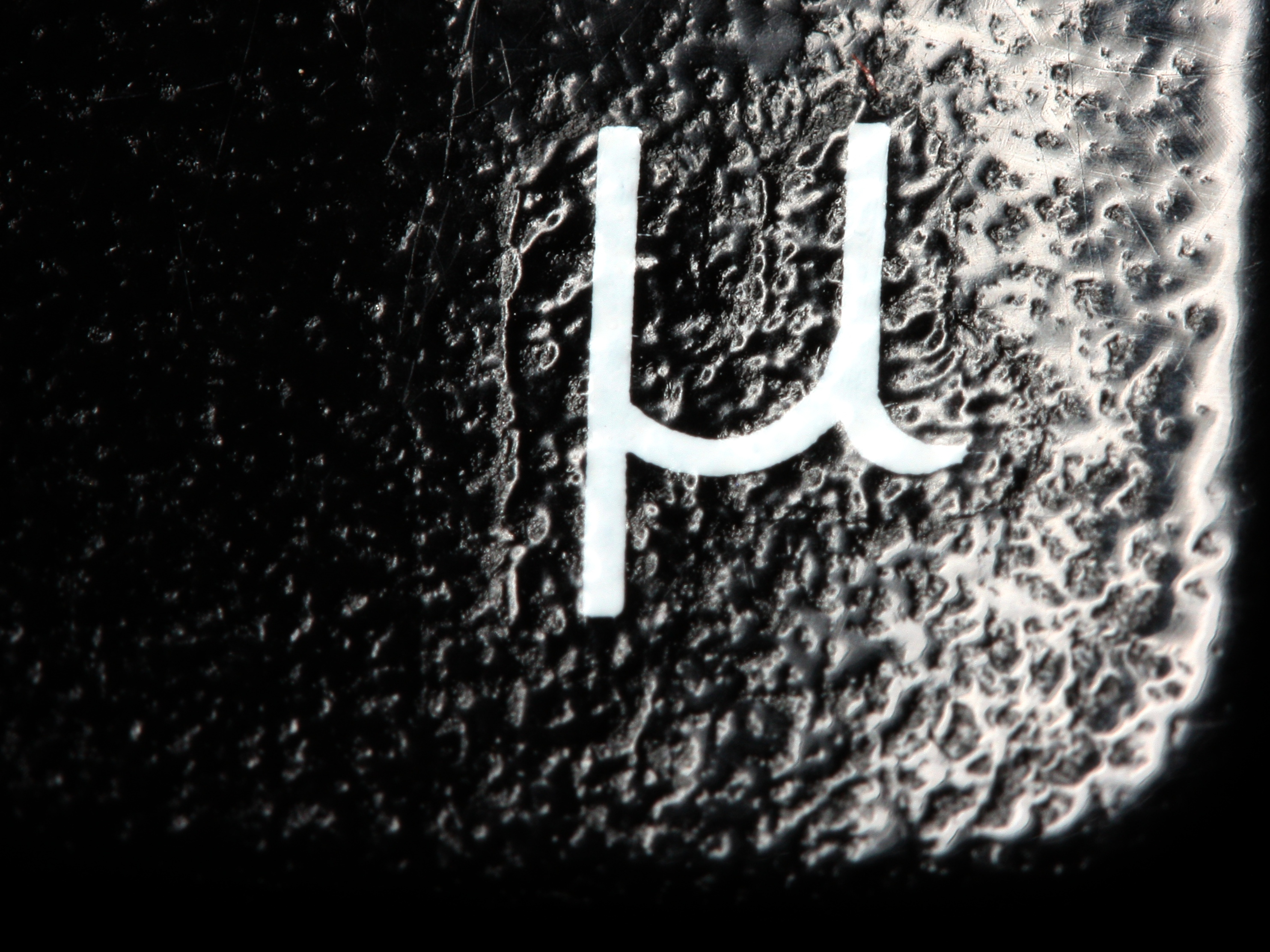
An up close view of the μ key on a keyboard.

Micro (Greek letter μ, mu, non-italic) is a unit prefix in the metric system denoting a factor of one millionth (10^{−6}). It comes from the Greek word μικρός (mikrós), meaning "small".

It is the only SI prefix which uses a character not from the Latin alphabet. In Unicode, the symbol is represented by U+03BC μ GREEK SMALL LETTER MU or the legacy symbol U+00B5 µ MICRO SIGN. The prefix "mc" is also commonly used; for example, "mcg" denotes a microgram (whereas mg denotes a milligram).

== Examples ==
- Typical bacteria are 1 to 10 μm in diameter.
- Human hair typically varies in diameter from 17 to 181 μm.
- Eukaryotic cells are typically 10 to 100 μm in diameter.
- Capacitance values of electrolytic capacitors in everyday electronics typically range from 1 to 47,000 μF

== Symbol encoding in character sets ==
The official symbol for the SI prefix micro is a Greek lowercase mu (μ). For reasons stemming from its design, Unicode has two different character codes for the letter, with slightly different appearance in some computer fonts, although most fonts use the same glyph. U+03BC μ GREEK SMALL LETTER MU is in the Greek range. According to The Unicode Consortium, the Greek letter character is preferred, but implementations must recognize the micro sign as well, for compatibility with legacy character sets. This distinction also occurs in some legacy code pages, notably Windows-1253.

In circumstances in which only the Latin alphabet is available, ISO 2955 (since 1974, withdrawn 2001), DIN 66030 (since 1980) and BS 6430 (since 1983) allow the prefix μ to be substituted by the letter ⟨u⟩ (U+0075 u LATIN SMALL LETTER U) as, for example, in um for μm, or uF for μF . Similarly, capacitor values according to the RKM code defined in IEC 60062 (since 1952) can be written as 4u7 (or 4U7) instead of 4μ7 if the Greek letter μ is not available.

The CJK Compatibility block contains square forms of some Japanese katakana measure and currency units. U+3343 ㍃ SQUARE MAIKURO corresponds to マイクロ maikuro.

== Other abbreviating conventions ==
In some health care institutions, house rules deprecate the standard symbol for microgram, "μg", in prescribing or chart recording, because of the risk of giving an incorrect dose because of the misreading of poor handwriting. The two alternatives are to abbreviate as "mcg" or to write out "microgram" in full (see also List of abbreviations used in medical prescriptions). The alternative abbreviation may be ambiguous in rare circumstances in that mcg could also be read as a micrigram, i.e. 10^{−14} g; however the prefix micri is not standard, nor widely known, and is considered obsolete. This deprecation, focused on avoiding incorrect dosing in contexts where handwriting is often present, does not extend to all health-care contexts and institutions (for example, some clinical laboratories' reports adhere to it, whereas others do not), and in physical sciences research, "μg" remains the sole official abbreviation.

In medical data exchange according to the Health Level 7 (HL7) standard, the μ can be replaced by u as well.

== See also ==
- Microgram
- Microscope
- Microsecond
- Microwave
- Square micrometre
- List of commonly used taxonomic affixes

SI prefixes
Prefix		Base 10	Decimal	Adoption (Note: Prefixes adopted before 1960 already existed before SI. The introduction of the centimetre–gram–second system of units was in 1873.)
Name	Symbol	Base 10	Decimal	Adoption
quetta	Q	10^{30}	1000000000000000000000000000000	2022
ronna	R	10^{27}	1000000000000000000000000000	2022
yotta	Y	10^{24}	1000000000000000000000000	1991
zetta	Z	10^{21}	1000000000000000000000	1991
exa	E	10^{18}	1000000000000000000	1975
peta	P	10^{15}	1000000000000000	1975
tera	T	10^{12}	1000000000000	1960
giga	G	10^{9}	1000000000	1960
mega	M	10^{6}	1000000	1873
kilo	k	10^{3}	1000	1795
hecto	h	10^{2}	100	1795
deca	da	10^{1}	10	1795
—	—	10^{0}	1	—
deci	d	10^{−1}	0.1	1795
centi	c	10^{−2}	0.01	1795
milli	m	10^{−3}	0.001	1795
micro	μ	10^{−6}	0.000001	1873
nano	n	10^{−9}	0.000000001	1960
pico	p	10^{−12}	0.000000000001	1960
femto	f	10^{−15}	0.000000000000001	1964
atto	a	10^{−18}	0.000000000000000001	1964
zepto	z	10^{−21}	0.000000000000000000001	1991
yocto	y	10^{−24}	0.000000000000000000000001	1991
ronto	r	10^{−27}	0.000000000000000000000000001	2022
quecto	q	10^{−30}	0.000000000000000000000000000001	2022
