= Mega- =

Metric prefix

Mega is a unit prefix in metric systems of units denoting a factor of one million (10^{6} or 1000000). It has the unit symbol M. It was confirmed for use in the International System of Units (SI) in 1960. Mega comes from Ancient Greek: μέγας, romanized: mégas, lit. 'great'.

== Common examples of usage ==
- Megapixel: 1 million pixels in a digital camera
- One megatonne of TNT equivalent amounts to approx. 4 petajoules and is the approximate energy released on igniting one million tonnes of TNT. The unit is often used in measuring the explosive power of nuclear weapons.
- Megahertz: frequency of electromagnetic radiation for radio and television broadcasting, GSM, etc. 1 MHz = 1,000,000 Hz.
- Megabyte: unit of information equal to one million bytes (SI standard).
- Megawatt: equal to one million watts of power. It is commonly used to measure the output of power plants, as well as the power consumption of electric locomotives, data centers, and other entities that heavily consume electricity.
- Megadeath: (or megacorpse) is one million human deaths, usually used in reference to projected number of deaths from a nuclear explosion. The term was used by scientists and thinkers who strategized likely outcomes of all-out nuclear warfare.

== Exponentiation ==
When units occur in exponentiation, such as in square and cubic forms, any multiples-prefix is considered part of the unit, and thus included in the exponentiation.

- 1 Mm^{2} means one square megametre or the size of a square of 1000000m by 1000000m or 10^{12}m^{2}, and not 1000000square metres (10^{6} m^{2}).
- 1 Mm^{3} means one cubic megametre or the size of a cube of 1000000m by 1000000m by 1000000m or 10^{18} m^{3}, and not 1000000cubic metres (10^{6} m^{3})

== Computing ==
In some fields of computing, mega may sometimes denote 1048576 (2^{20}) information units, for example, a megabyte, a megaword, but denotes 1000000 (10^{6}) units of other quantities, for example, transfer rates: 1megabit/s = 1000000bit/s. In the case of 3½-inch floppy disks, sizes were given in megabytes of 1000 kB or 1024000 bytes. The prefix mebi- has been suggested as a prefix for 2^{20} to avoid ambiguity.

== See also ==
- Binary prefix
- Mebibyte
- Order of magnitude
- RKM code

SI prefixes
Prefix		Base 10	Decimal	Adoption (Note: Prefixes adopted before 1960 already existed before SI. The introduction of the centimetre–gram–second system of units was in 1873.)
Name	Symbol	Base 10	Decimal	Adoption
quetta	Q	10^{30}	1000000000000000000000000000000	2022
ronna	R	10^{27}	1000000000000000000000000000	2022
yotta	Y	10^{24}	1000000000000000000000000	1991
zetta	Z	10^{21}	1000000000000000000000	1991
exa	E	10^{18}	1000000000000000000	1975
peta	P	10^{15}	1000000000000000	1975
tera	T	10^{12}	1000000000000	1960
giga	G	10^{9}	1000000000	1960
mega	M	10^{6}	1000000	1873
kilo	k	10^{3}	1000	1795
hecto	h	10^{2}	100	1795
deca	da	10^{1}	10	1795
—	—	10^{0}	1	—
deci	d	10^{−1}	0.1	1795
centi	c	10^{−2}	0.01	1795
milli	m	10^{−3}	0.001	1795
micro	μ	10^{−6}	0.000001	1873
nano	n	10^{−9}	0.000000001	1960
pico	p	10^{−12}	0.000000000001	1960
femto	f	10^{−15}	0.000000000000001	1964
atto	a	10^{−18}	0.000000000000000001	1964
zepto	z	10^{−21}	0.000000000000000000001	1991
yocto	y	10^{−24}	0.000000000000000000000001	1991
ronto	r	10^{−27}	0.000000000000000000000000001	2022
quecto	q	10^{−30}	0.000000000000000000000000000001	2022
