= International System of Units =

Modern form of the metric system

The International System of Units, internationally known by the abbreviation SI (from its official French name, Système international d'unités), is the modern form of the metric system and the world's most widely used system of measurement. It is the only system of measurement with official status in nearly every country in the world, employed in science, technology, industry, and everyday commerce. The International Bureau of Weights and Measures (abbreviated BIPM from French: Bureau international des poids et mesures) coordinates the SI.

SI base units (outer ring) and constants (inner ring)

The seven SI base units
Symbol	Name	Quantity
s	second	time
m	metre	length
kg	kilogram	mass
A	ampere	electric current
K	kelvin	thermodynamic temperature
mol	mole	amount of substance
cd	candela	luminous intensity

The SI comprises a coherent system of units of measurement starting with seven base units, which are the second (symbol: s, the unit of time), metre (m, length), kilogram (kg, mass), ampere (A, electric current), kelvin (K, thermodynamic temperature), mole (mol, amount of substance), and candela (cd, luminous intensity). The system can accommodate coherent units for an unlimited number of additional quantities. These are called coherent derived units, which can always be represented as products of powers of the base units. Twenty-two coherent derived units have been provided with special names and symbols.

The 7 base units and the 22 coherent derived units with special names and symbols may be used in combination to express other coherent derived units. Since the sizes of coherent units will be convenient for only some applications and not for others, the SI provides 24 prefixes which, when added to the name and symbol of a coherent unit, produce 24 additional (non-coherent) SI units for the same quantity; these non-coherent units are always decimal (i.e. power-of-ten) multiples and sub-multiples of the coherent unit.

The current way of defining the SI is a result of a decades-long move towards definitions of the units that do not depend on artefacts made as physical realisations. A consequence is that as science and technologies develop, new and potentially superior realisations may be introduced without the need to redefine the unit. One problem with artefacts is that they can be lost, damaged, or changed; another is that they introduce uncertainties that cannot be reduced by advancements in science and technology.

The original motivation for the development of the SI was the diversity of units that had sprung up within the centimetre–gram–second (CGS) systems (specifically the inconsistency between the systems of electrostatic units and electromagnetic units) and the lack of coordination between the various disciplines that used them. The General Conference on Weights and Measures (French: Conférence générale des poids et mesures – CGPM), which was established by the Metre Convention of 1875, brought together many international organisations to establish the definitions and standards of a new system and to standardise the rules for writing and presenting measurements. The system was published in 1960 as a result of an initiative that began in 1948, and is based on the metre–kilogram–second system of units (MKS) combined with ideas from the development of the CGS system.

== Definition ==
The International System of Units consists of a set of seven defining constants with seven corresponding base units, derived units, and a set of decimal-based multipliers that are used as prefixes.

=== SI defining constants ===
SI defining constants
Symbol	Defining constant	Exact value and units
Δν_{Cs}	hyperfine transition frequency of ^{133}Cs	9192631770 Hz
c	speed of light	299792458 m/s
h	Planck constant	6.62607015×10^{−34} J⋅s
e	elementary charge	1.602176634×10^{−19} C
k	Boltzmann constant	1.380649×10^{−23} J/K
N_{A}	Avogadro constant	6.02214076×10^{23} mol^{−1}
K_{cd}	luminous efficacy of 540 THz radiation	683 lm/W

The seven defining constants are the most fundamental feature of the definition of the system of units. Each defining constant consists of an exact numerical value and units. The defining constants are the speed of light in vacuum c, the hyperfine transition frequency of caesium Δν_{Cs}, the Planck constant h, the elementary charge e, the Boltzmann constant k, the Avogadro constant N_{A}, and the luminous efficacy K_{cd}. The nature of the defining constants ranges from fundamental constants of nature such as c to the purely technical constant K_{cd}. The values assigned to these constants were fixed to ensure continuity with previous definitions of the base units.

=== SI base units ===
The SI selects seven units to serve as base units, corresponding in number to seven base physical quantities. They are the second for time, metre for length, kilogram for mass, ampere for electric current, kelvin for thermodynamic temperature, mole for amount of substance, and candela for luminous intensity. The base units are defined in terms of the defining constants. For example, the kilogram is defined, building on the definitions of the second and the metre, by taking the Planck constant h to be 6.62607015×10^{−34} J⋅s, giving the expression in terms of the defining constants

1 kg = (299792458)^{2}/((6.62607015×10^{−34})(9192631770))(h Δν_{Cs})/c^{2}.

All units in the SI can be expressed in terms of the base units, and the base units serve as a preferred set for expressing or analysing the relationships between units. The choice of which and even how many quantities to use as base quantities is not fundamental or even unique – it is a matter of convention.

SI base units
Unit name	Unit symbol	Dimension symbol	Quantity name	Typical symbols	Definition
second	s	$\mathsf{T}$	time	$t$	The duration of 9192631770 periods of the radiation corresponding to the transition between the two hyperfine levels of the ground state of the caesium-133 atom.
metre	m	$\mathsf{L}$	length	$l$, $x$, $r$	The length of the path travelled by light in vacuum during a time interval with duration of 1/299792458 of a second.
kilogram (Note: For historical reasons, the kilogram (not the gram) is the coherent base unit of mass, and is used in the definitions of derived units. Nonetheless, names and symbols for decimal multiples and sub-multiples of the unit of mass are formed by attaching prefix names and symbols to the unit name "gram" and the unit symbol "g" respectively.)	kg	$\mathsf{M}$	mass	$m$	The kilogram is defined by setting the Planck constant h to 6.62607015×10^{−34} J⋅s (J = kg⋅m^{2}⋅s^{−2}), given the definitions of the metre and the second.
ampere	A	$\mathsf{I}$	electric current	$I,\; i$	The flow of 1/(1.602176634×10^{−19}) times the elementary charge e per second, which is approximately 6.2415090744×10^{18} elementary charges per second.
kelvin	K	$\Theta$	thermodynamic temperature	$T$	The kelvin is defined by setting the fixed numerical value of the Boltzmann constant k to 1.380649×10^{−23} J⋅K^{−1} (J = kg⋅m^{2}⋅s^{−2}), given the definition of the kilogram, the metre, and the second.
mole	mol	$\mathsf{N}$	amount of substance	$n$	The amount of substance of 6.02214076×10^{23} elementary entities. (Note: When the mole is used, the elementary entities must be specified and may be atoms, molecules, ions, electrons, other particles, or specified groups of such particles.) This number is the fixed numerical value of the Avogadro constant, N_{A}, when expressed in the unit mol^{−1}.
candela	cd	$\mathsf{J}$	luminous intensity	$I_{\rm v}$	The candela is defined by taking the fixed numerical value of the luminous efficacy of monochromatic radiation of frequency 540×10^{12} Hz, K_{cd}, to be 683 when expressed in the unit lm⋅W^{−1}.

=== Derived units ===
The system allows for an unlimited number of additional units, called derived units, which can always be represented as products of powers of the base units, possibly with a nontrivial numeric multiplier. When that multiplier is one, the unit is called a coherent derived unit. For example, the coherent derived SI unit of velocity is the metre per second, with the symbol m/s. The base and coherent derived units of the SI together form a coherent system of units (the set of coherent SI units). A useful property of a coherent system is that when the numerical values of physical quantities are expressed in terms of the units of the system, then the equations between the numerical values have exactly the same form, including numerical factors, as the corresponding equations between the physical quantities.

Twenty-two coherent derived units have been provided with special names and symbols as shown in the table below. The radian and steradian have no base units but are treated as derived units for historical reasons.

The 22 SI derived units with special names and symbols
Name	Symbol	Quantity	In SI base units	In other SI units
radian (Note: The radian and steradian are defined as dimensionless derived units.)	rad	plane angle		1
steradian	sr	solid angle		1
hertz	Hz	frequency	s^{−1}	
newton	N	force	kg⋅m⋅s^{−2}	
pascal	Pa	pressure, stress	kg⋅m^{−1}⋅s^{−2}	N/m^{2}
joule	J	energy, work, amount of heat	kg⋅m^{2}⋅s^{−2}	N⋅m
watt	W	power, radiant flux	kg⋅m^{2}⋅s^{−3}	J/s
coulomb	C	electric charge	s⋅A	
volt	V	electric potential difference (Note: Also called "voltage", "tension" or "electromotive force".)	kg⋅m^{2}⋅s^{−3}⋅A^{−1}	W/A
ohm	Ω	electrical resistance	kg⋅m^{2}⋅s^{−3}⋅A^{−2}	V/A
siemens	S	electrical conductance	kg^{−1}⋅m^{−2}⋅s^{3}⋅A^{2}	A/V
farad	F	capacitance	kg^{−1}⋅m^{−2}⋅s^{4}⋅A^{2}	C/V
henry	H	inductance	kg⋅m^{2}⋅s^{−2}⋅A^{−2}	Wb/A
tesla	T	magnetic flux density	kg⋅s^{−2}⋅A^{−1}	Wb/m^{2}
weber	Wb	magnetic flux	kg⋅m^{2}⋅s^{−2}⋅A^{−1}	V⋅s
degree Celsius	°C	Celsius temperature	K	
lumen	lm	luminous flux	cd⋅sr (Note: In photometry, the steradian is usually retained in expressions for units.)	
lux	lx	illuminance	cd⋅sr⋅m^{−2}	lm/m^{2}
becquerel	Bq	activity referred to a radionuclide	s^{−1}	
gray	Gy	absorbed dose, kerma	m^{2}⋅s^{−2}	J/kg
sievert	Sv	dose equivalent	m^{2}⋅s^{−2}	J/kg
katal	kat	catalytic activity	mol⋅s^{−1}	

==== Notes ====
The derived units in the SI are formed by powers, products, or quotients of the base units and are unlimited in number.

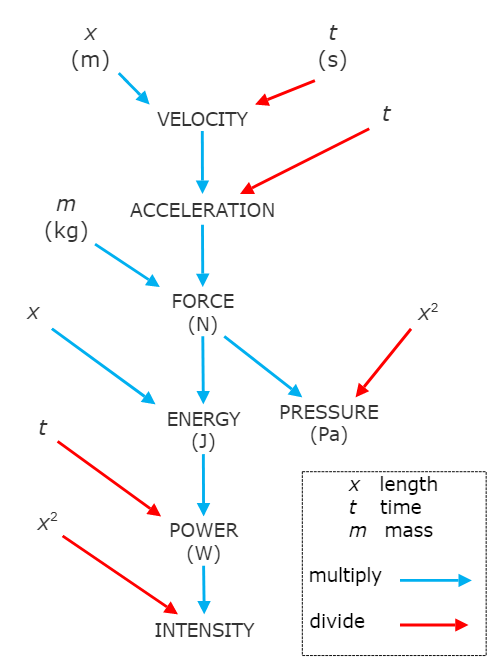
Arrangement of the principal measurements in physics based on the mathematical manipulation of length, time, and mass

Derived units apply to some derived quantities, which may by definition be expressed in terms of base quantities, and thus are not independent; for example, electrical conductance is the inverse of electrical resistance, with the consequence that the siemens is the inverse of the ohm, and similarly, the ohm and siemens can be replaced with a ratio of an ampere and a volt, because those quantities bear a defined relationship to each other. (Note: Ohm's law: 1 Ω = 1 V/A from the relationship E = I × R, where E is electromotive force or voltage (unit: volt), I is current (unit: ampere), and R is resistance (unit: ohm).) Other useful derived quantities can be specified in terms of the SI base and derived units that have no named units in the SI, such as acceleration, which has the SI unit m/s^{2}.

A combination of base and derived units may be used to express a derived unit. For example, the SI unit of force is the newton (N), the SI unit of pressure is the pascal (Pa) – and the pascal can be defined as one newton per square metre (N/m^{2}).

=== Prefixes ===
Like all metric systems, the SI uses metric prefixes to systematically construct, for the same physical quantity, a set of units that are decimal multiples of each other over a wide range. For example, driving distances are normally given in kilometres (symbol km) rather than in metres. Here the metric prefix 'kilo-' (symbol 'k') stands for a factor of 1000; thus, 1 km = 1000 m.

The SI provides twenty-four metric prefixes that signify decimal powers ranging from 10^{−30} to 10^{30}, the most recent being adopted in 2022. Most prefixes correspond to integer powers of 1000; the only ones that do not are those for 10, 1/10, 100, and 1/100. The conversion between different SI units for one and the same physical quantity is always through a power of ten. This is why the SI (and metric systems more generally) is called decimal systems of measurement units.

The grouping formed by a prefix symbol attached to a unit symbol (e.g. 'km', 'cm') constitutes a new inseparable unit symbol. This new symbol can be raised to a positive or negative power. It can also be combined with other unit symbols to form compound unit symbols. For example, g/cm^{3} is an SI unit of density, where cm^{3} is to be interpreted as (cm)^{3}.

Prefixes are added to unit names to produce multiples and submultiples of the original unit. All of these are integer powers of ten, and above a hundred or below a hundredth all are integer powers of a thousand. For example, kilo- denotes a multiple of a thousand and milli- denotes a multiple of a thousandth, so there are one thousand millimetres to the metre and one thousand metres to the kilometre. The prefixes are never combined, so for example a millionth of a metre is a micrometre, not a millimillimetre. Multiples of the kilogram are named as if the gram were the base unit, so a millionth of a kilogram is a milligram, not a microkilogram.

The BIPM specifies 24 prefixes for the International System of Units (SI):

SI prefixes
Prefix		Base 10	Decimal	Adoption (Note: Prefixes adopted before 1960 already existed before SI. The introduction of the centimetre–gram–second system of units was in 1873.)
Name	Symbol	Base 10	Decimal	Adoption
quetta	Q	10^{30}	1000000000000000000000000000000	2022
ronna	R	10^{27}	1000000000000000000000000000	2022
yotta	Y	10^{24}	1000000000000000000000000	1991
zetta	Z	10^{21}	1000000000000000000000	1991
exa	E	10^{18}	1000000000000000000	1975
peta	P	10^{15}	1000000000000000	1975
tera	T	10^{12}	1000000000000	1960
giga	G	10^{9}	1000000000	1960
mega	M	10^{6}	1000000	1873
kilo	k	10^{3}	1000	1795
hecto	h	10^{2}	100	1795
deca	da	10^{1}	10	1795
—	—	10^{0}	1	—
deci	d	10^{−1}	0.1	1795
centi	c	10^{−2}	0.01	1795
milli	m	10^{−3}	0.001	1795
micro	μ	10^{−6}	0.000001	1873
nano	n	10^{−9}	0.000000001	1960
pico	p	10^{−12}	0.000000000001	1960
femto	f	10^{−15}	0.000000000000001	1964
atto	a	10^{−18}	0.000000000000000001	1964
zepto	z	10^{−21}	0.000000000000000000001	1991
yocto	y	10^{−24}	0.000000000000000000000001	1991
ronto	r	10^{−27}	0.000000000000000000000000001	2022
quecto	q	10^{−30}	0.000000000000000000000000000001	2022

=== Coherent and non-coherent SI units ===
The base units and the derived units formed as the product of powers of the base units with a numerical factor of one form a coherent system of units. Every physical quantity has exactly one coherent SI unit. For example, 1 m/s = (1 m) / (1 s) is the coherent derived unit for velocity. With the exception of the kilogram (for which the prefix kilo- is required for a coherent unit), when prefixes are used with the coherent SI units, the resulting units are no longer coherent, because the prefix introduces a numerical factor other than one. For example, the metre, kilometre, centimetre, nanometre, etc. are all SI units of length, though only the metre is a coherent SI unit. The complete set of SI units consists of both the coherent set and the multiples and sub-multiples of coherent units formed by using the SI prefixes.

The kilogram is the only coherent SI unit whose name and symbol include a prefix. For historical reasons, the names and symbols for multiples and sub-multiples of the unit of mass are formed as if the gram were the base unit. Prefix names and symbols are attached to the unit name gram and the unit symbol g respectively. For example, 10^{−6} kg is written milligram and mg, not microkilogram and μkg.

The same coherent SI unit may be used for different physical quantities. For example, the joule per kelvin (symbol J/K) is the coherent SI unit for two distinct quantities, heat capacity and entropy, and the ampere is the coherent SI unit for both electric current and magnetomotive force.

Furthermore, the same coherent SI unit may be a base unit in one context, but a coherent derived unit in another. For example, the ampere is a base unit when it is a unit of electric current, but a coherent derived unit when it is a unit of magnetomotive force.

Examples of coherent derived units in terms of base units
Name	Symbol	Derived quantity	Typical symbol
square metre	m^{2}	area	A
cubic metre	m^{3}	volume	V
metre per second	m/s	speed, velocity	v
metre per second squared	m/s^{2}	acceleration	a
reciprocal metre	m^{−1}	wavenumber	σ, ṽ
reciprocal metre	m^{−1}	vergence (optics)	V, 1/f
kilogram per cubic metre	kg/m^{3}	density	ρ
kilogram per square metre	kg/m^{2}	surface density	ρ_{A}
cubic metre per kilogram	m^{3}/kg	specific volume	v
ampere per square metre	A/m^{2}	current density	j
ampere per metre	A/m	magnetic field strength	H
mole per cubic metre	mol/m^{3}	concentration	c
kilogram per cubic metre	kg/m^{3}	mass concentration	ρ, γ
candela per square metre	cd/m^{2}	luminance	L_{v}

Examples of derived units that include units with special names
Name	Symbol	Quantity	In SI base units
pascal-second	Pa⋅s	dynamic viscosity	m^{−1}⋅kg⋅s^{−1}
newton-metre	N⋅m	moment of force	m^{2}⋅kg⋅s^{−2}
newton per metre	N/m	surface tension	kg⋅s^{−2}
radian per second	rad/s	angular velocity, angular frequency	s^{−1}
radian per second squared	rad/s^{2}	angular acceleration	s^{−2}
watt per square metre	W/m^{2}	heat flux density, irradiance	kg⋅s^{−3}
joule per kelvin	J/K	entropy, heat capacity	m^{2}⋅kg⋅s^{−2}⋅K^{−1}
joule per kilogram-kelvin	J/(kg⋅K)	specific heat capacity, specific entropy	m^{2}⋅s^{−2}⋅K^{−1}
joule per kilogram	J/kg	specific energy	m^{2}⋅s^{−2}
watt per metre-kelvin	W/(m⋅K)	thermal conductivity	m⋅kg⋅s^{−3}⋅K^{−1}
joule per cubic metre	J/m^{3}	energy density	m^{−1}⋅kg⋅s^{−2}
volt per metre	V/m	electric field strength	m⋅kg⋅s^{−3}⋅A^{−1}
coulomb per cubic metre	C/m^{3}	electric charge density	m^{−3}⋅s⋅A
coulomb per square metre	C/m^{2}	surface charge density, electric flux density, electric displacement	m^{−2}⋅s⋅A
farad per metre	F/m	permittivity	m^{−3}⋅kg^{−1}⋅s^{4}⋅A^{2}
henry per metre	H/m	permeability	m⋅kg⋅s^{−2}⋅A^{−2}
joule per mole	J/mol	molar energy	m^{2}⋅kg⋅s^{−2}⋅mol^{−1}
joule per mole-kelvin	J/(mol⋅K)	molar entropy, molar heat capacity	m^{2}⋅kg⋅s^{−2}⋅K^{−1}⋅mol^{−1}
coulomb per kilogram	C/kg	exposure (X- and γ-rays)	kg^{−1}⋅s⋅A
gray per second	Gy/s	absorbed dose rate	m^{2}⋅s^{−3}
watt per steradian	W/sr	radiant intensity	m^{2}⋅kg⋅s^{−3}
watt per square metre-steradian	W/(m^{2}⋅sr)	radiance	kg⋅s^{−3}
katal per cubic metre	kat/m^{3}	catalytic activity concentration	m^{−3}⋅s^{−1}⋅mol

== Lexicographic conventions ==
Example of lexical conventions. In the expression of acceleration due to gravity, a space separates the value and the units, both the 'm' and the 's' are lowercase because neither the metre nor the second are named after people, and exponentiation is represented with a superscript '2'.

=== Unit names ===
The SI standard is that unit names are treated as common nouns of the context language. This means they are typeset in the same character set as other common nouns (e.g. Latin alphabet in English, Cyrillic script in Russian, etc.), and follow the usual grammatical and orthographical rules of the context language. For example, in English and French, even when the unit is named after a person and its symbol begins with a capital letter, the unit name in running text starts with a lowercase letter (e.g., newton, hertz, pascal) and is capitalised only at the beginning of a sentence and in headings and publication titles. As a nontrivial application of this rule, the name of the unit with the symbol °C is spelled as 'degree Celsius': the first letter of the name of the unit, 'd', is in lowercase, while the modifier 'Celsius' is capitalised because it is a proper name.

The English spelling and even names for certain SI units, prefixes and non-SI units depend on the variety of English used. US English uses the spelling deka-, meter, and liter, and International English uses deca-, metre, and litre. The name of the unit whose symbol is t and which is defined by 1 t = 10^{3} kg is 'metric ton' in US English and 'tonne' in International English.

=== Unit symbols and the values of quantities ===
Symbols of SI units are intended to be unique and universal, independent of the context language. The standard provides style conventions for among other aspects of displaying quantities units: the quantity symbols, formatting of numbers and the decimal marker, expressing measurement uncertainty, multiplication and division of quantity symbols, and the use of pure numbers and various angles.

In the United States, the guideline produced by the National Institute of Standards and Technology (NIST) interprets the international standard by clarifying some language-specific details for American English. For example, since 1979, the litre may exceptionally be written using either an uppercase "L" or a lowercase "l", a decision prompted by the similarity of the lowercase letter "l" to the numeral "1", especially with certain typefaces or English-style handwriting. NIST recommends that within the United States, "L" be used rather than "l".

== Realisation of units ==
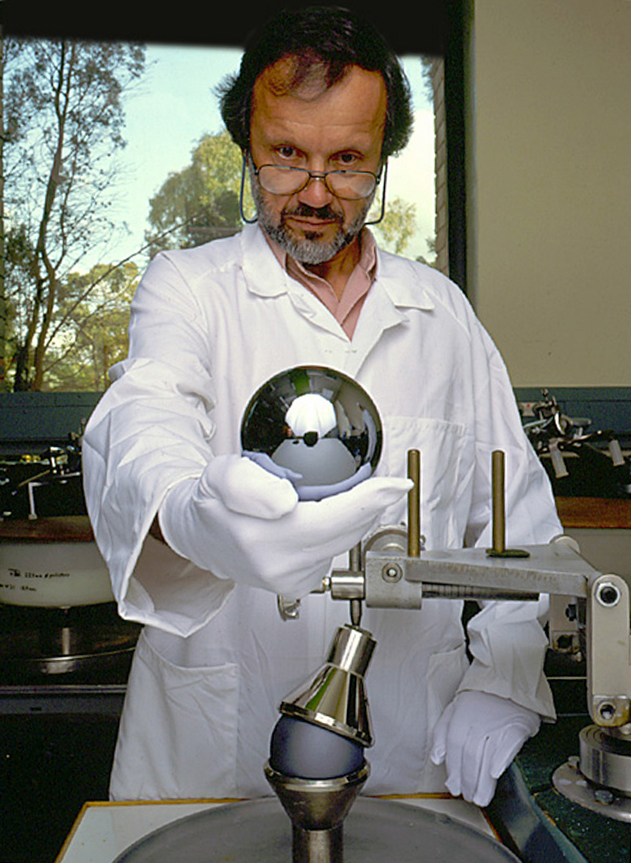
Silicon sphere for the Avogadro project used for measuring the Avogadro constant to a relative standard uncertainty of 2×10^{−8} or less, held by Achim Leistner

Metrologists carefully distinguish between the definition of a unit and its realisation. The SI units are defined by declaring that seven defining constants have certain exact numerical values when expressed in terms of their SI units. The realisation of the definition of a unit is the procedure by which the definition may be used to establish the value and associated uncertainty of a quantity of the same kind as the unit.

For each base unit the BIPM publishes a mises en pratique, (French for 'putting into practice; implementation',) describing the current best practical realisations of the unit. The separation of the defining constants from the definitions of units means that improved measurements can be developed leading to changes in the mises en pratique as science and technology develop, without having to revise the definitions.

The published mise en pratique is not the only way in which a base unit can be determined. Various consultative committees of the CIPM decided in 2016 that more than one mise en pratique would be developed for determining the value of each unit. These methods include the following:

- At least three separate experiments be carried out yielding values having a relative standard uncertainty in the determination of the kilogram of no more than 5×10^{−8} and at least one of these values should be better than 2×10^{−8}. Both the Kibble balance and the Avogadro project should be included in the experiments and any differences between these be reconciled.
- The definition of the kelvin measured with a relative uncertainty of the Boltzmann constant derived from two fundamentally different methods such as acoustic gas thermometry and dielectric constant gas thermometry be better than one part in 10^{−6} and that these values be corroborated by other measurements.

== Organisational status ==
Countries using the metric (SI), imperial, and US customary systems as of 2019

The International System of Units, or SI, is a decimal and metric system of units established in 1960 and periodically updated since then. The SI has an official status in most countries, including the United States, Canada, and the United Kingdom, although these three countries are among the handful of nations that, to various degrees, also continue to use their customary systems. Nevertheless, with this nearly universal level of acceptance, the SI "has been used around the world as the preferred system of units, the basic language for science, technology, industry, and trade."

The only other types of measurement system that still have widespread use across the world are the imperial and US customary measurement systems. The international yard and pound are defined in terms of the SI.

=== International System of Quantities ===
The quantities and equations that provide the context in which the SI units are defined are now referred to as the International System of Quantities (ISQ). The ISQ is based on the base quantities underlying each of the seven base units of the SI. Derived quantities, such as area, pressure, and electrical resistance, follow from these base quantities by clear, non-contradictory equations. The ISQ defines the quantities that are measured with the SI units. The ISQ is formalised, in part, in the international standard ISO/IEC 80000, which was completed in 2009 with the publication of ISO 80000-1, and has largely been revised in 2019–2020.

=== Controlling authority ===
The SI is regulated and continually developed by three international organisations that were established in 1875 under the terms of the Metre Convention. They are the General Conference on Weights and Measures (CGPM (Note: From French: Conférence générale des poids et mesures.)), the International Committee for Weights and Measures (CIPM (Note: from French: Comité international des poids et mesures)), and the International Bureau of Weights and Measures (BIPM (Note: from French: Bureau international des poids et mesures)). All the decisions and recommendations concerning units are collected in a brochure called The International System of Units (SI), which is published in French and English by the BIPM and periodically updated. The writing and maintenance of the brochure is carried out by one of the committees of the CIPM. The definitions of the terms "quantity", "unit", "dimension", etc. that are used in the SI Brochure are those given in the international vocabulary of metrology. The brochure leaves some scope for local variations, particularly regarding unit names and terms in different languages. For example, the United States' National Institute of Standards and Technology (NIST) has produced a version of the CGPM document (NIST SP 330), which clarifies usage for English-language publications that use American English.

== History ==
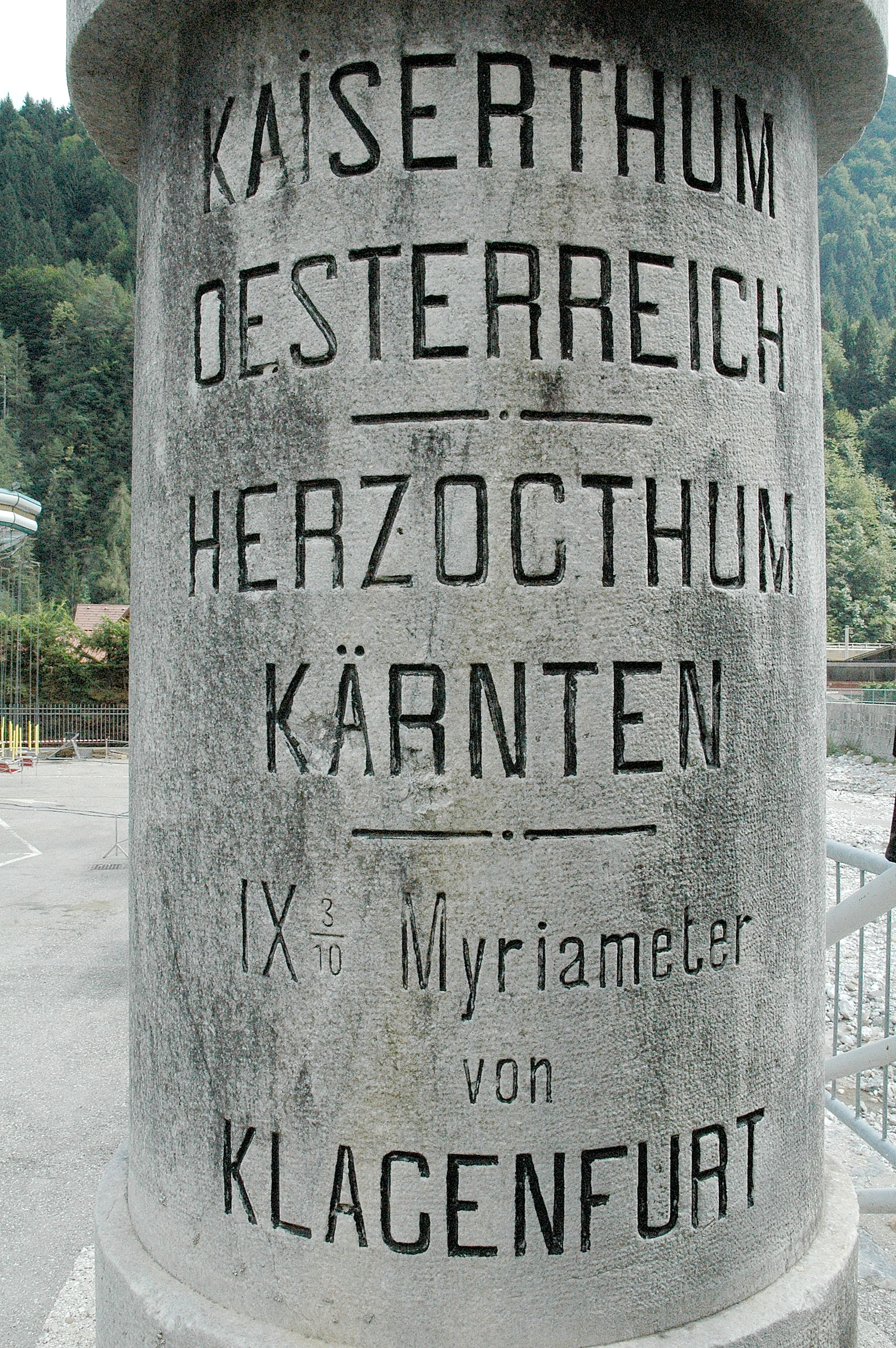
Stone marking the Austro-Hungarian/Italian border at Pontebba displaying myriametres, a unit of 10 km used in Central Europe in the 19th century (but since deprecated)

=== CGS and MKS systems ===
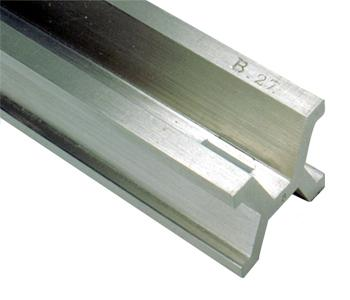
Closeup of the National Prototype Metre, serial number 27, allocated to the United States

The concept of a system of units emerged a hundred years before the SI. In the 1860s, James Clerk Maxwell, William Thomson (later Lord Kelvin), and others working under the auspices of the British Association for the Advancement of Science, building on previous work of Carl Gauss, developed the centimetre–gram–second system of units or cgs system in 1874. The systems formalised the concept of a collection of related units called a coherent system of units. In a coherent system, base units combine to define derived units without extra factors. For example, using metre per second is coherent in a system that uses metre for length and second for time, but kilometre per hour is not coherent. The principle of coherence was successfully used to define a number of units of measure based on the CGS, including the erg for energy, the dyne for force, the barye for pressure, the poise for dynamic viscosity and the stokes for kinematic viscosity.

=== Metre Convention ===
A French-inspired initiative for international cooperation in metrology led to the signing in 1875 of the Metre Convention, also called Treaty of the Metre, by 17 nations. (Note: Argentina, Austria-Hungary, Belgium, Brazil, Denmark, France, German Empire, Italy, Peru, Portugal, Russia, Spain, Sweden and Norway, Switzerland, Ottoman Empire, United States, and Venezuela.) The General Conference on Weights and Measures (French: Conférence générale des poids et mesures – CGPM), which was established by the Metre Convention, brought together many international organisations to establish the definitions and standards of a new system and to standardise the rules for writing and presenting measurements. Initially the convention only covered standards for the metre and the kilogram. This became the foundation of the MKS system of units.

=== Giovanni Giorgi and the problem of electrical units ===
At the close of the 19th century three different systems of units of measure existed for electrical measurements: a CGS-based system for electrostatic units, also known as the Gaussian or ESU system, a CGS-based system for electromechanical units (EMU), and an International system based on units defined by the Metre Convention for electrical distribution systems. Attempts to resolve the electrical units in terms of length, mass, and time using dimensional analysis was beset with difficulties – the dimensions depended on whether one used the ESU or EMU systems. This anomaly was resolved in 1901 when Giovanni Giorgi published a paper in which he advocated using a fourth base unit alongside the existing three base units. The fourth unit could be chosen to be electric current, voltage, or electrical resistance.

Electric current with named unit 'ampere' was chosen as the base unit, and the other electrical quantities derived from it according to the laws of physics. When combined with the MKS the new system, known as MKSA, was approved in 1946.

=== 9th CGPM, the precursor to SI ===
In 1948, the 9th CGPM commissioned a study to assess the measurement needs of the scientific, technical, and educational communities and "to make recommendations for a single practical system of units of measurement, suitable for adoption by all countries adhering to the Metre Convention". This working document was Practical system of units of measurement. Based on this study, the 10th CGPM in 1954 defined an international system derived from six base units: the metre, kilogram, second, ampere, degree Kelvin, and candela.

The 9th CGPM also approved the first formal recommendation for the writing of symbols in the metric system when the basis of the rules as they are now known was laid down. These rules were subsequently extended and now cover unit symbols and names, prefix symbols and names, how quantity symbols should be written and used, and how the values of quantities should be expressed.

=== Birth of the SI ===
The 10th CGPM in 1954 resolved to create an international system of units and in 1960, the 11th CGPM adopted the International System of Units, abbreviated SI from the French name Le Système international d'unités, which included a specification for units of measurement.

The International Bureau of Weights and Measures (BIPM) has described SI as "the modern form of metric system". In 1968, the unit "degree Kelvin" was renamed "kelvin". In 1971 the mole became the seventh base unit of the SI.

=== 2019 redefinition ===
Dependencies of the SI base units on seven physical constants, which are assigned exact numerical values in the 2019 redefinition. Unlike in the previous definitions, the base units are all derived exclusively from constants of nature. Here, a → b means that a is used to define b.

After the metre was redefined in 1960, the International Prototype of the Kilogram (IPK) was the only physical artefact upon which base units (directly the kilogram and indirectly the ampere, mole and candela) depended for their definition, making these units subject to periodic comparisons of national standard kilograms with the IPK. During the 2nd and 3rd Periodic Verification of National Prototypes of the Kilogram, a significant divergence had occurred between the mass of the IPK and all of its official copies stored around the world: the copies had all noticeably increased in mass with respect to the IPK. During extraordinary verifications carried out in 2014 preparatory to redefinition of metric standards, continuing divergence was not confirmed. Nonetheless, the residual and irreducible instability of a physical IPK undermined the reliability of the entire metric system to precision measurement from small (atomic) to large (astrophysical) scales. By avoiding the use of an artefact to define units, all issues with the loss, damage, and change of the artefact are avoided.

A proposal was made that:

- In addition to the speed of light, four constants of nature – the Planck constant, an elementary charge, the Boltzmann constant, and the Avogadro constant – be defined to have exact values
- The International Prototype of the Kilogram be retired
- The current definitions of the kilogram, ampere, kelvin, and mole be revised
- The wording of base unit definitions should change emphasis from explicit unit to explicit constant definitions.

The new definitions were adopted at the 26th CGPM on 16 November 2018, and came into effect on 20 May 2019. The change was adopted by the European Union through Directive (EU) 2019/1258.

Prior to its redefinition in 2019, the SI was defined through the seven base units from which the derived units were constructed as products of powers of the base units. After the redefinition, the SI is defined by fixing the numerical values of seven defining constants. This has the effect that the distinction between the base units and derived units is, in principle, not needed, since all units, base as well as derived, may be constructed directly from the defining constants. Nevertheless, the distinction is retained because "it is useful and historically well established", and also because the ISO/IEC 80000 series of standards, which define the International System of Quantities (ISQ), specifies base and derived quantities that necessarily have the corresponding SI units.

== Related units ==
=== Non-SI units ===
While not an SI unit, the litre is widely used. It is equivalent to (10 cm)^{3} = 10^{−3} m^{3}.

Many non-SI units continue to be widely used, but with values referenced to SI units. The SI Brochure lists several such units, including the hour, minute, degree of angle, litre, and decibel, most of which it previously described as "accepted for use with the SI". Since June 2026 such units have instead been described as "non-SI units" whose values are "important to recall".

Non-SI units previously described as "accepted"
Name	Symbol	Quantity	Value in SI units
minute	min	time	1 min = 60 s
hour	h	time	1 h = 60 min = 3600 s (= 3.6 ks)
day	d	time	1 d = 24 h = 1440 min = 86400 s (= 86.4 ks)
astronomical unit	au	length	1 au = 149597870700 m (≈ 149.6 Gm)
degree	°	plane angle and phase angle	1° = (π / 180) rad (≈ 17.5 mrad)
minute	′	plane angle and phase angle	1′ = (1 / 60)° = (π / 10800) rad (≈ 290.9 μrad)
second	″	plane angle and phase angle	1″ = (1 / 60)′ = (1 / 3600)° = (π / 648000) rad (≈ 4.8 μrad)
hectare	ha	area	1 ha = 1 hm^{2} = 10000 m^{2}
litre	l; L	volume	1 L = 1 dm^{3} = 1000 cm^{3} = 0.001 m^{3}
tonne	t	mass	1 t = 1 Mg = 1000 kg
dalton	Da	mass	1 Da = 1.66053906892(52)×10^{−27} kg (Note: A footnote in the 9th SI Brochure gives an exact definition of the dalton.) (≈ 1.7 yg)
electronvolt	eV	energy	1 eV = 1.602176634×10^{−19} J (≈ 160.2 aJ)
neper	Np	logarithmic ratio quantity	—N/a
bel, decibel	B; dB	logarithmic ratio quantity	—N/a

The SI prefixes can be used with several of these units, but not, for example, with the non-SI units of time. Others, in order to be converted to the corresponding SI unit, require conversion factors that are not powers of ten. Some common examples of such units are the customary units of time, namely the minute (conversion factor of 60 s/min, since 1 min = 60 s), the hour (3600 s), and the day (86400 s); the degree (for measuring plane angles, 1° = (π/180) rad); and the electronvolt (a unit of energy, 1 eV = 1.602176634×10^{−19} J).

=== Metric units not recognised by SI ===
Although the term metric system is often used as an informal alternative name for the International System of Units, other metric systems exist, some of which were in widespread use in the past or are even still used in particular areas. There are also individual metric units such as the sverdrup and the darcy that exist outside of any system of units. Most of the units of the other metric systems are not recognised by the SI.

=== Unacceptable uses ===
Unit symbols should not include any information about a particular quantity. For example, the information that a voltage reading is a maximum value should be associated with the quantity symbol, not with the unit symbol. Thus,
$$U_\textrm{max} = 1000\ \textrm{V}$$
is acceptable but
$$U = 1000\ \textrm{V}_\textrm{max}$$
is unacceptable.

== See also ==
- Conversion of units – Comparison of various scales
- List of international common standards
- Metrication – Conversion to the metric system of measurement
- Outline of the metric system – Overview of and topical guide to the metric system

Organisations

- International Bureau of Weights and Measures – Intergovernmental organisation
- Institute for Reference Materials and Measurements – Promotes a common European measurement system
- National Institute of Standards and Technology – Measurement standards laboratory in the United States

Standards and conventions

- Conventional electrical unit – Historical high-precision units of measurement
- Coordinated Universal Time (UTC) – Primary time standard globally used to regulate clocks and time
- Unified Code for Units of Measure – System of codes for unambiguously representing measurement units

== Notes ==
Attribution

This article incorporates text from this source, which is available under the CC BY 3.0 license.
