= Deci- =

Metric system prefix meaning one tenth

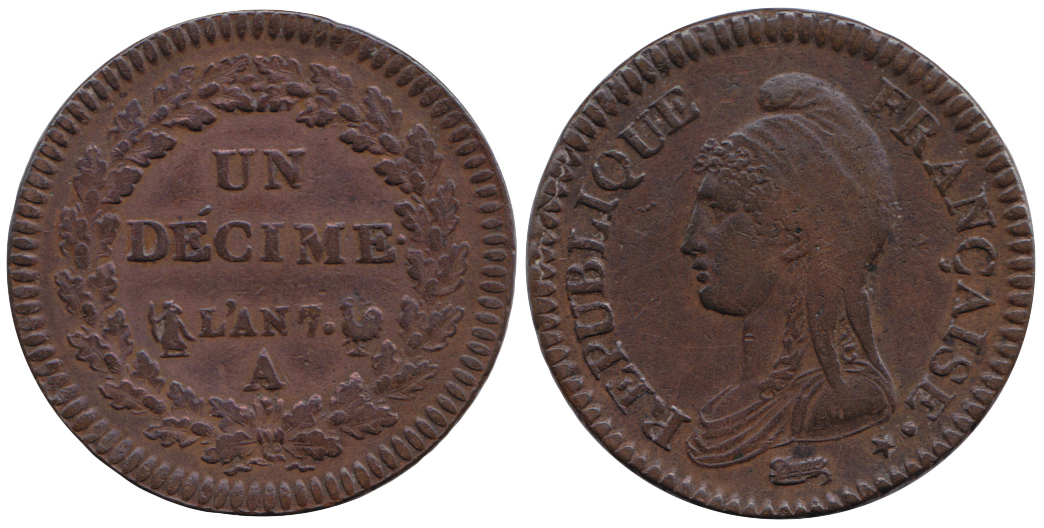
French 1 decime coin, equal to 1/10 of a franc. First Republic.

Deci (symbol d) is a decimal unit prefix in the metric system denoting a factor of one tenth. Proposed in 1793, and adopted in 1795, the prefix comes from the Latin decimus, meaning "tenth". Since 1960, the prefix is part of the International System of Units (SI).

A frequent use of the prefix is in the unit deciliter (dl), common in food recipes; many European homes have a deciliter measure for flour, water, etc. A common measure in engineering is the unit decibel for measuring ratios of power and root-power quantities, such as sound level and electrical amplification.

Example

- The diameter of a compact disc is about 12 centimetres or 1.2 decimetres.

SI prefixes
Prefix		Base 10	Decimal	Adoption (Note: Prefixes adopted before 1960 already existed before SI. The introduction of the centimetre–gram–second system of units was in 1873.)
Name	Symbol	Base 10	Decimal	Adoption
quetta	Q	10^{30}	1000000000000000000000000000000	2022
ronna	R	10^{27}	1000000000000000000000000000	2022
yotta	Y	10^{24}	1000000000000000000000000	1991
zetta	Z	10^{21}	1000000000000000000000	1991
exa	E	10^{18}	1000000000000000000	1975
peta	P	10^{15}	1000000000000000	1975
tera	T	10^{12}	1000000000000	1960
giga	G	10^{9}	1000000000	1960
mega	M	10^{6}	1000000	1873
kilo	k	10^{3}	1000	1795
hecto	h	10^{2}	100	1795
deca or deka	da	10^{1}	10	1795
—	—	10^{0}	1	—
deci	d	10^{−1}	0.1	1795
centi	c	10^{−2}	0.01	1795
milli	m	10^{−3}	0.001	1795
micro	μ	10^{−6}	0.000001	1873
nano	n	10^{−9}	0.000000001	1960
pico	p	10^{−12}	0.000000000001	1960
femto	f	10^{−15}	0.000000000000001	1964
atto	a	10^{−18}	0.000000000000000001	1964
zepto	z	10^{−21}	0.000000000000000000001	1991
yocto	y	10^{−24}	0.000000000000000000000001	1991
ronto	r	10^{−27}	0.000000000000000000000000001	2022
quecto	q	10^{−30}	0.000000000000000000000000000001	2022
