= Giga- =

Metric prefix

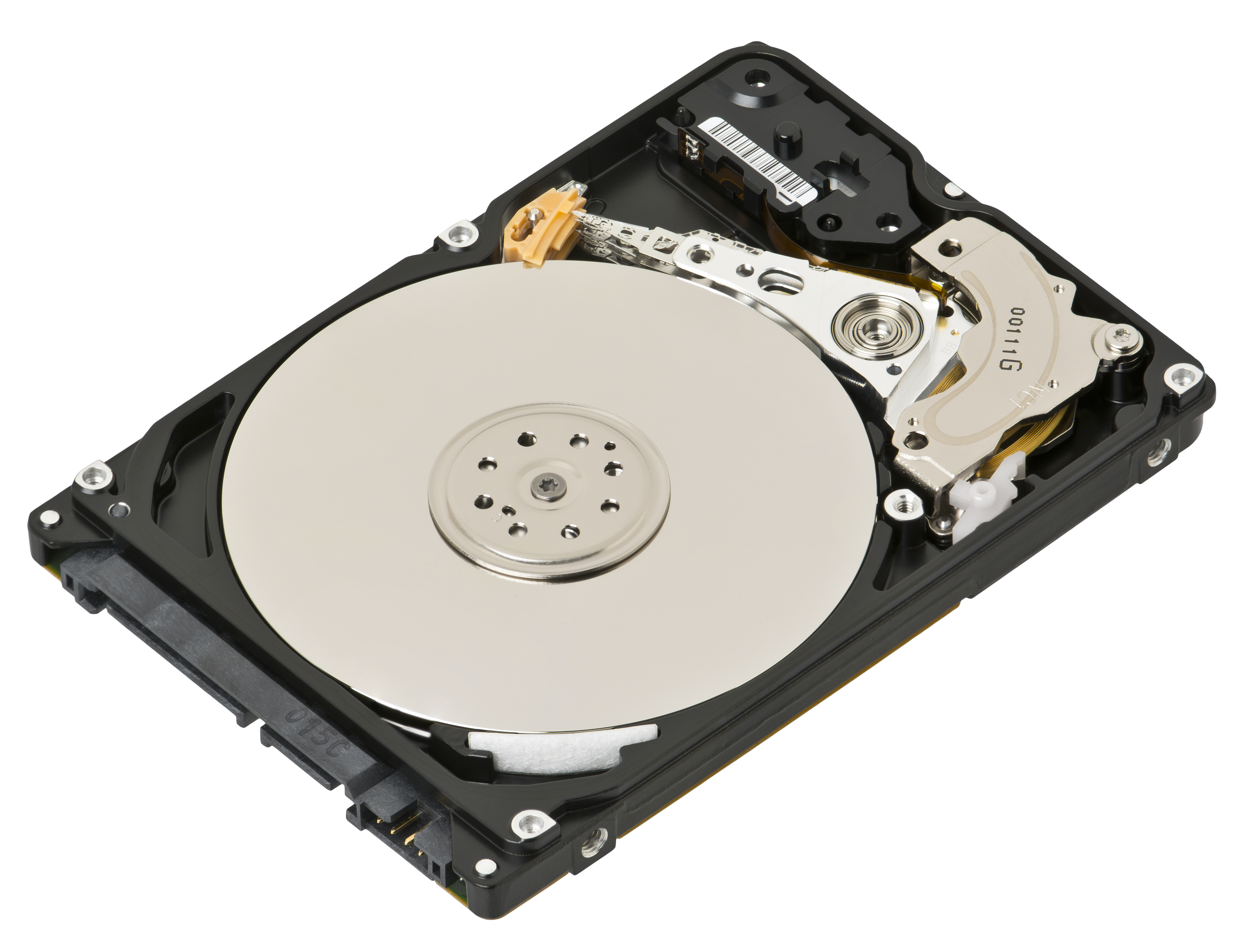
Laptop hard drive, with its platter exposed.

Giga- (/ˈɡɪɡə/ or /ˈdʒɪɡə/) is a unit prefix in the metric system denoting a factor of a short-scale billion or long-scale milliard (10^{9} or 1,000,000,000). It has the symbol G.

Giga- is derived from the Greek word γίγας (gígas), meaning "giant". The Oxford English Dictionary reports the earliest written use of giga in this sense to be in the Reports of the IUPAC 14th Conférence Internationale de Chimie in 1947: "The following prefixes to abbreviations for the names of units should be used: G giga 10^{9}×." However, it was already used in 1932 by the German organization Verband deutscher Elektrotechniker.

When referring to information units in computing, such as gigabyte, giga may sometimes mean 1073741824 (2^{30}); this causes ambiguity. Standards organizations discourage this and use giga- to refer to 10^{9} in this context too. Gigabit is only rarely used with the binary interpretation of the prefix. The binary prefix gibi has been adopted for 2^{30}, while reserving giga exclusively for the metric definition.

== Pronunciation ==
In English, the prefix giga can be pronounced /ˈɡɪɡə/ (a hard g as in giggle), or /ˈdʒɪɡə/ (a soft g as in gigantic, which shares giga's Ancient Greek root). A prominent example of this latter pronunciation is found in the pronunciation of gigawatts in the 1985 film Back to the Future.

According to the American writer Kevin Self, a German committee member of the International Electrotechnical Commission proposed giga as a prefix for 10^{9} in the 1920s, drawing on a verse (evidently "Anto-logie") by the German humorous poet Christian Morgenstern that appeared in the third (1908) edition of his Galgenlieder (Gallows Songs). This suggests that a hard German [ɡ] was originally intended as the pronunciation. Self was unable to ascertain when the /dʒ/ (soft g) pronunciation came into occasional use, but claimed that as of 1995 it had returned to /ɡ/ (hard g).

In 1998, a poll by the phonetician John C. Wells found that 84% of Britons preferred the pronunciation of gigabyte starting with /ɡɪ/ (as in gig), 9% with /dʒɪ/ (as in jig), 6% with /ɡaɪ/ (guy), and 1% with /dʒaɪ/ (as in giant).

== Common usage ==
- gigahertz—clock rate of a CPU, for instance, 3 GHz = 3000000000Hz
- gigabit—bandwidth of a network link, for instance, 1 Gbit/s = 1000000000bit/s.
- gigabyte—for instance, for hard disk capacity, 120 GB = 120000000000bytes;
- gigayear or gigaannum—one billion (10^{9}) years, sometimes abbreviated Gyr, but the preferred usage is Ga or, for years ago, GA.

== Binary prefix ==
The notation 1 GB represents 1,000,000,000 bytes or, in deprecated usage, 1,073,741,824 (2^{30}) bytes. Per IEC 60027-2 A.2 and ISO/IEC 80000 standards, the correct notation of 2^{30} is gibi (symbol Gi). One gibibyte (1 GiB) is 1,073,741,824 bytes or approximately 1.074 GB. Despite international standards, the use of 1 GB = 2^{30} B is widespread. A laptop advertised as having 8 GB has 8,589,934,592 bytes of memory: 8.59×10^{9} B, or 8 GiB.

== See also ==
- Binary prefix
- Gigabit Ethernet
- SI prefix
- List of commonly used taxonomic affixes
- RKM code

SI prefixes
Prefix		Base 10	Decimal	Adoption (Note: Prefixes adopted before 1960 already existed before SI. The introduction of the centimetre–gram–second system of units was in 1873.)
Name	Symbol	Base 10	Decimal	Adoption
quetta	Q	10^{30}	1000000000000000000000000000000	2022
ronna	R	10^{27}	1000000000000000000000000000	2022
yotta	Y	10^{24}	1000000000000000000000000	1991
zetta	Z	10^{21}	1000000000000000000000	1991
exa	E	10^{18}	1000000000000000000	1975
peta	P	10^{15}	1000000000000000	1975
tera	T	10^{12}	1000000000000	1960
giga	G	10^{9}	1000000000	1960
mega	M	10^{6}	1000000	1873
kilo	k	10^{3}	1000	1795
hecto	h	10^{2}	100	1795
deca	da	10^{1}	10	1795
—	—	10^{0}	1	—
deci	d	10^{−1}	0.1	1795
centi	c	10^{−2}	0.01	1795
milli	m	10^{−3}	0.001	1795
micro	μ	10^{−6}	0.000001	1873
nano	n	10^{−9}	0.000000001	1960
pico	p	10^{−12}	0.000000000001	1960
femto	f	10^{−15}	0.000000000000001	1964
atto	a	10^{−18}	0.000000000000000001	1964
zepto	z	10^{−21}	0.000000000000000000001	1991
yocto	y	10^{−24}	0.000000000000000000000001	1991
ronto	r	10^{−27}	0.000000000000000000000000001	2022
quecto	q	10^{−30}	0.000000000000000000000000000001	2022
