= Names of small numbers =

This is a list of the names of small decimal numbers in English.

== Table ==
The following table lists the names of small numbers used in the long and short scales, along with the power of 10, engineering notation, and International System of Units (SI) symbols and prefixes.

Power of ten	Engineering notation	Short scale (U.S. and modern British)	Long scale (continental Europe, archaic British, and India)	SI prefix	SI symbol
10^{0}	1	One			
10^{−1}	100×10^{−3}	One Tenth		deci-	d
10^{−2}	10×10^{−3}	One One-Hundredth		centi-	c
10^{−3}	1×10^{−3}	One One-Thousandth		milli-	m
10^{−6}	1×10^{−6}	One One-Millionth		micro-	μ
10^{−9}	1×10^{−9}	One One-Billionth	One One-Milliardth	nano-	n
10^{−12}	1×10^{−12}	One One-Trillionth	One One-Billionth	pico-	p
10^{−15}	1×10^{−15}	One One-Quadrillionth	One One-Billiardth	femto-	f
10^{−18}	1×10^{−18}	One One-Quintillionth	One One-Trillionth	atto-	a
10^{−21}	1×10^{−21}	One One-Sextillionth	One One-Trilliardth	zepto-	z
10^{−24}	1×10^{−24}	One One-Septillionth	One One-Quadrillionth	yocto-	y
10^{−27}	1×10^{−27}	One One-Octillionth	One One-Quardilliardth	ronto-	r
10^{−30}	1×10^{−30}	One One-Nonillionth	One One-Quintillionth	quecto-	q
10^{−33}	1×10^{−33}	One One-Decillionth	One One-Quintilliardth		
10^{−36}	1×10^{−36}	One One-Undecillionth	One One-Sextillionth		
0	1×10^{−∞}	Zero			
–1	–1	Negative One			
−∞	undefined	Negative Infinity			

== See also ==
- Names of large numbers
- Number names
- Numeral prefix
- Metric prefix
