= Orders of magnitude (numbers) =

The logarithmic scale can compactly represent the relationships between variously sized numbers.

This list contains selected positive numbers in increasing order of magnitude, including counts of things, dimensionless quantities, and probabilities. Each number is given a name in the short scale, which is used in English-speaking countries, as well as a name in the long scale, which is used in some of the countries that do not have English as their national language.

== Smaller than 10^{−1000} ==
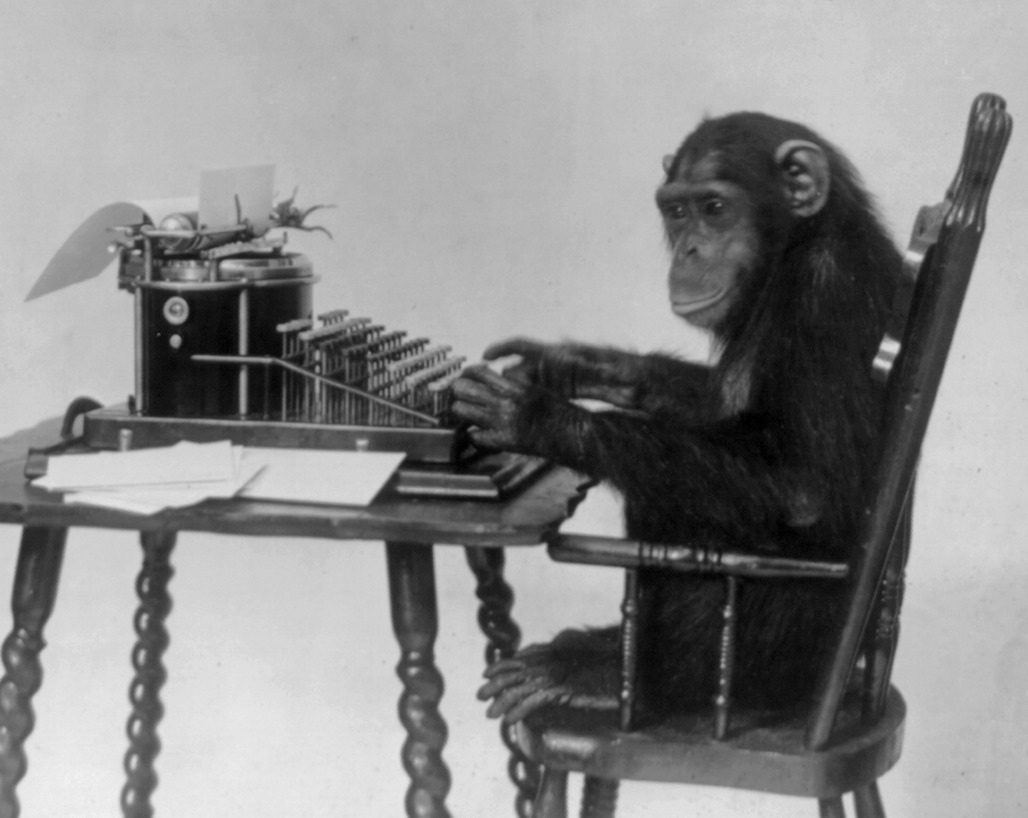
Chimpanzee probably not typing Hamlet

- Mathematics: The difference between 3 and the next smallest fusible number is less than $1 / (2 \uparrow^9 16)$ in Knuth's up-arrow notation.
- Mathematics: 2^{−1541023937} ≈ 8.4489×10^{−463894430} is the difference between 3 and the next smallest tame fusible number as defined by Erickson et al. (2021).
- Mathematics: 10^{−183800} is the approximate probability that a typing "monkey", or an English-illiterate typing robot, when placed in front of a typewriter with no spaces or punctuation, will type out William Shakespeare's play Hamlet on the first try.
- Computing: 2^{−262378} ≈ 2.24800708647703657297018614776265182597360918266100276294348974547709294462×10^{−78984} is the smallest non-zero value that can be represented by an octuple-precision IEEE floating-point value.
- Computing: 2^{−262142} ≈ 2.48242795146434978829932822291387172367768770607964686927095329791378756×10^{−78913} is the smallest positive normal number that can be represented by an octuple-precision IEEE floating-point value.
- Computing: 1×10^{−6176} is the smallest non-zero value that can be represented by a quadruple-precision IEEE decimal floating-point value.
- Computing: 1×10^{−6143} is the smallest positive normal number that can be represented by a quadruple-precision IEEE decimal floating-point value.
- Computing: 2^{−16494} ≈ 6.4751751194380251109244389582276466×10^{−4966} is the smallest non-zero value that can be represented by a quadruple-precision IEEE floating-point value.
- Computing: 2^{−16445} ≈ 3.6451995318824746025×10^{−4951} is the smallest non-zero value that can be represented by an 80-bit x86 double-extended IEEE floating-point value.
- Computing: 2^{−16382} ≈ 3.3621031431120935062626778173217526×10^{−4932} is the smallest positive normal number that can be represented by a quadruple-precision IEEE floating-point value and an 80-bit x86 double-extended IEEE floating-point value.

== 10^{−1000} to 10^{−100} (one googolth) ==
- Computing: 1×10^{−398} is the smallest non-zero value that can be represented by a double-precision IEEE decimal floating-point value.
- Computing: 1×10^{−383} is the smallest positive normal number that can be represented by a double-precision IEEE decimal floating-point value.
- Computing: 2^{−1074} ≈ 4.9406564584124654×10^{−324} is the smallest non-zero value that can be represented by a double-precision IEEE floating-point value.
- Computing: 2^{−1022} ≈ 2.2250738585072014×10^{−308} is the smallest positive normal number that can be represented by a double-precision IEEE floating-point value.
- Mathematics: $365!/365^{365}$ ≈ 1.45×10^{−157} is the probability that in a randomly selected group of 365 people, all of them will have different birthdays.
- Computing: 1×10^{−101} is the smallest non-zero value that can be represented by a single-precision IEEE decimal floating-point value.

== 10^{−100} to 10^{−30} ==
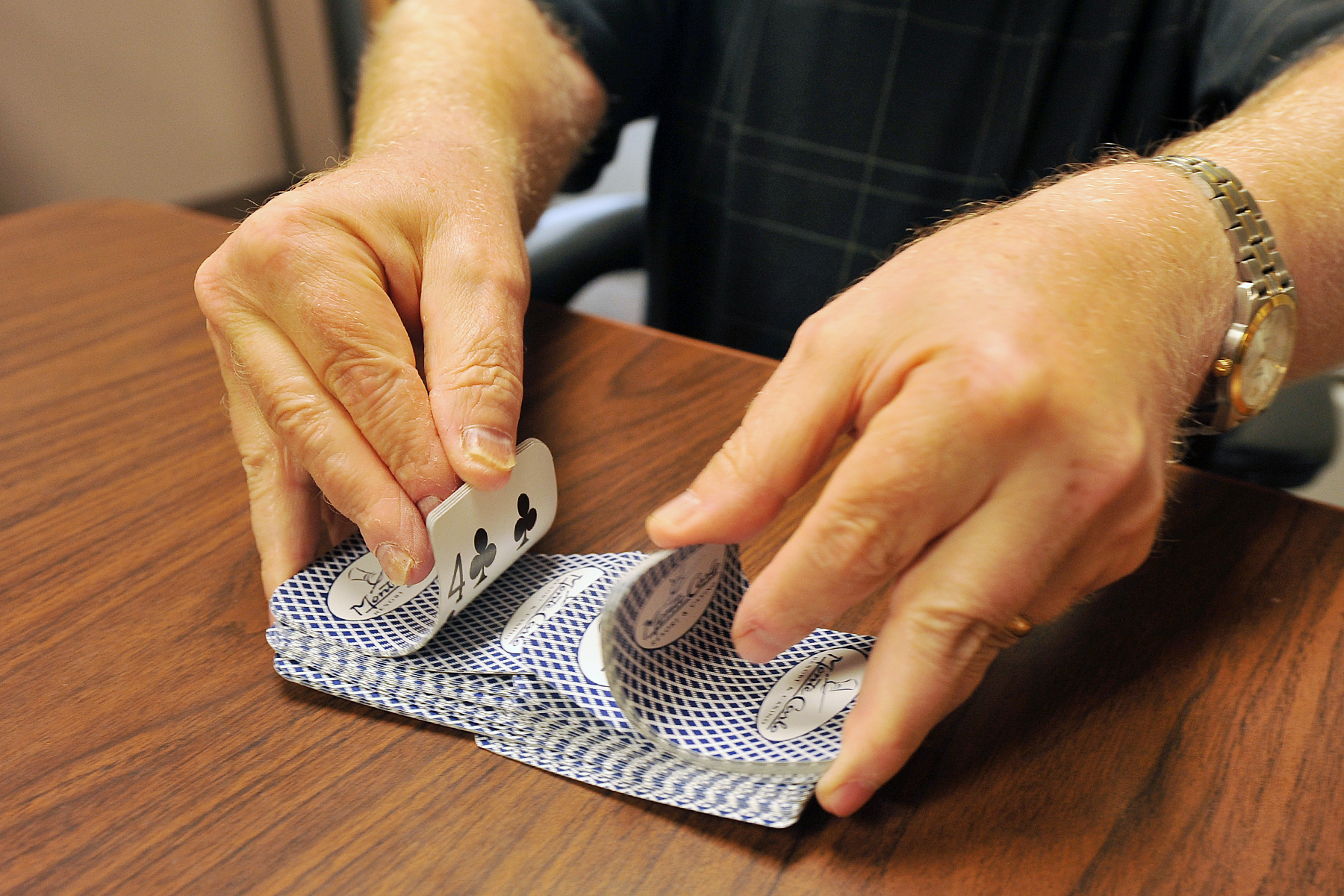
1/52! chance of a specific shuffle

- Computing: 1×10^{−95} is equal to the smallest positive normal number that can be represented by a single-precision IEEE decimal floating-point value.
- Mathematics: 1/52! ≈ 1.24×10^{−68} is the probability of shuffling a standard 52-card deck in any specific order.
- Computing: 2^{−149} ≈ 1.4012985×10^{−45} is the smallest positive non-zero value that can be represented by a single-precision IEEE floating-point value.
- Computing: 2^{−126} ≈ 1.1754944×10^{−38} is the smallest positive normal number that can be represented by a single-precision IEEE floating-point value.

== 10^{−30} ==
(0.000000000000000000000000000001; 1000^{−10}; short scale: one nonillionth; long scale: one quintillionth)

ISO: quecto- (q)

- Mathematics: $4! \times (13!)^4 / 52!$ ≈ 4.47×10^{−28} is the approximate probability in a game of bridge of all four players getting a complete suit each.

== 10^{−27} ==
(0.000000000000000000000000001; 1000^{−9}; short scale: one octillionth; long scale: one quadrilliardth)

ISO: ronto- (r)

== 10^{−24} ==
(0.000000000000000000000001; 1000^{−8}; short scale: one septillionth; long scale: one quadrillionth)

ISO: yocto- (y)

== 10^{−21} ==
(0.000000000000000000001; 1000^{−7}; short scale: one sextillionth; long scale: one trilliardth)

ISO: zepto- (z)

- Mathematics: 2^{−63} ≈ 1.08×10^{−19} is the odds of a perfect bracket in the NCAA Division I men's basketball tournament if coin flips of 50/50 are used to predict the winners of the 63 matches.
- Mathematics: $1/\binom{80}{20}$ ≈ 2.83×10^{−19} is the probability of matching 20 numbers for 20 in a game of keno.

== 10^{−18} ==
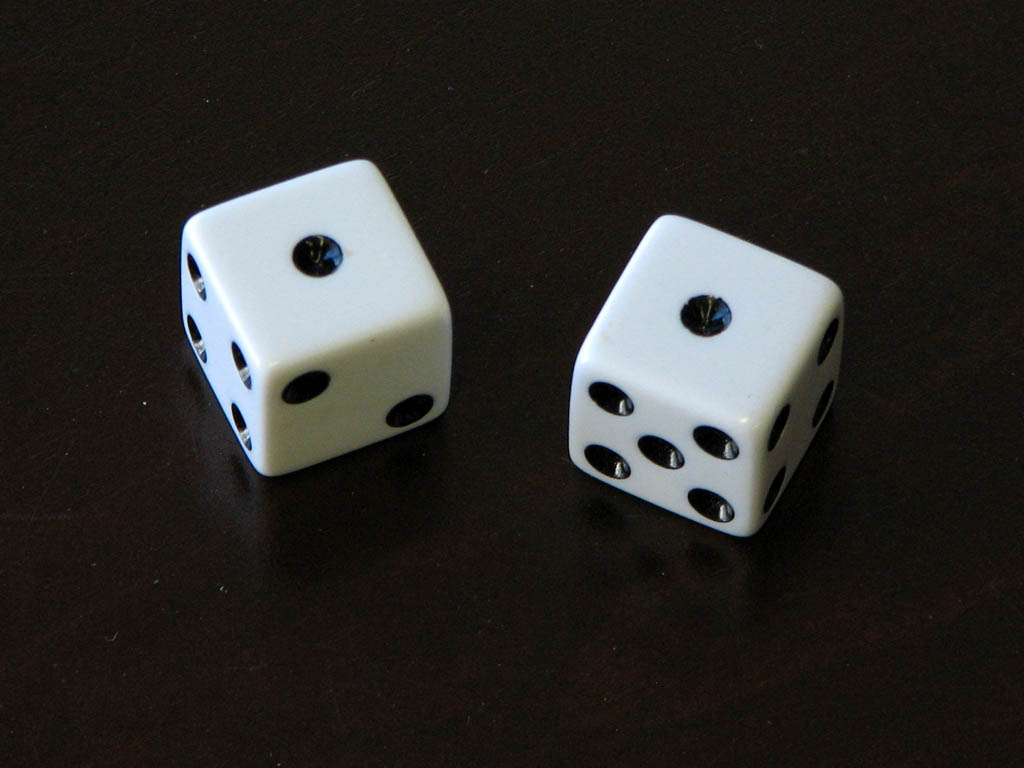
Snake eyes

(0.000000000000000001; 1000^{−6}; short scale: one quintillionth; long scale: one trillionth)

ISO: atto- (a)

- Mathematics: 36^{−10} ≈ 2.74×10^{−16} is the probability of rolling snake eyes 10 times in a row on a pair of fair dice.

== 10^{−15} ==
(0.000000000000001; 1000^{−5}; short scale: one quadrillionth; long scale: one billiardth)

ISO: femto- (f)

- Mathematics: The Ramanujan constant, $e^{\pi\sqrt{163}} = 262\,537\,412\,640\,768\,743.999\,999\,999\,999\,25\ldots,$ is an almost integer, differing from the nearest integer by approximately 7.5×10^{−13}.

== 10^{−12} ==
(0.000000000001; 1000^{−4}; short scale: one trillionth; long scale: one billionth)

ISO: pico- (p)

- Mathematics: 2.52×10^{−11} is the approximate probability in a game of bridge of one player getting a complete suit.
- Biology: Human visual sensitivity to 1000 nm light is approximately 1.0×10^{−10} of its peak sensitivity at 555 nm.

== 10^{−9} ==
(0.000000001; 1000^{−3}; short scale: one billionth; long scale: one milliardth)

ISO: nano- (n)

- Mathematics – Lottery: The odds of winning the Grand Prize (matching all 6 numbers) in the US Powerball lottery, with a single ticket, under the rules as of October 2015, are 292,201,338 to 1 against, for a probability of 3.422×10^{−9} (0.0000003422%).
- Mathematics – Lottery: The odds of winning the Grand Prize (matching all 6 numbers) in the Australian Powerball lottery, with a single ticket, under the rules as of April 2018, are 134,490,400 to 1 against, for a probability of 7.435×10^{−9} (0.0000007435%).
- Mathematics – Lottery: The odds of winning the Jackpot (matching the 6 main numbers) in the current 59-ball UK National Lottery Lotto, with a single ticket, under the rules as of December 2024, are 45,057,474 to 1 against, for a probability of 2.219×10^{−8} (0.000002219%).
- Computing: 2^{−24} ≈ 5.960×10^{−8} is the smallest positive non-zero value that can be represented by a half-precision IEEE floating-point value.
- Mathematics – Lottery: The odds of winning the Jackpot (matching the 6 main numbers) in the former 49-ball UK National Lottery, with a single ticket, were 13,983,815 to 1 against, for a probability of 7.151×10^{−8} (0.000007151%).

== 10^{−6} ==
(0.000001; 1000^{−2}; long and short scales: one millionth)

ISO: micro- (μ)

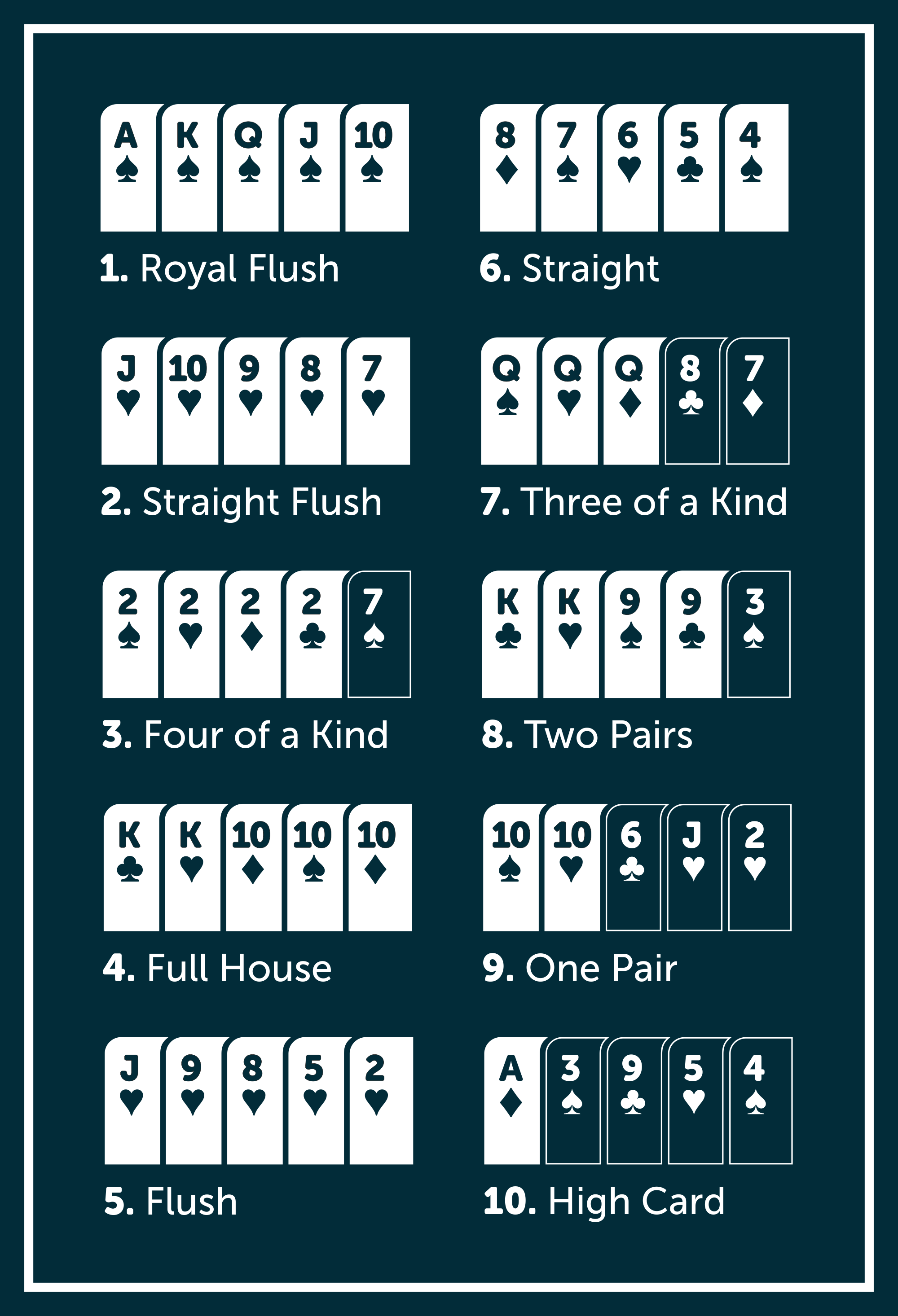
Poker hands

Poker hands
Hand	Chance
1. Royal flush	0.00015%
2. Straight flush	0.0014%
3. Four of a kind	0.024%
4. Full house	0.14%
5. Flush	0.19%
6. Straight	0.59%
7. Three of a kind	2.1%
8. Two pairs	4.8%
9. One pair	42%
10. No pair	50%

- Mathematics – Poker: The odds of being dealt a royal flush in poker are approximately 649,739 to 1 against, for a probability of 1.5×10^{−6} (0.00015%).

== 10^{−5} ==
(0.00001; one hundred-thousandth)

- Mathematics – Poker: The odds of being dealt a straight flush (other than a royal flush) in poker are approximately 72,192 to 1 against, for a probability of 1.4×10^{−5} (0.0014%).
- Computing: 2^{−14} ≈ 6.104×10^{−5} is approximately equal to the smallest positive normal number that can be represented by a half-precision IEEE floating-point value.

== 10^{−4} ==
(0.0001; one ten-thousandth)

- Mathematics: The chance of an American nickel landing on its edge and staying there is about 1 in 6,000 ≈ 1.7×10^{−4} (0.017%) according to a computational model.
- Mathematics – Poker: The odds of being dealt a four of a kind in poker are approximately 4,164 to 1 against, for a probability of 2.4×10^{−4} (0.024%).
- Mathematics: 2^{−10} = 9.765625×10^{−4} is the probability of getting the predicted outcome 10 fair coin tosses in a row.

== 10^{−3} ==
(0.001; 1000^{−1}; one thousandth)

ISO: milli- (m)

- Mathematics – Poker: The odds of being dealt a full house in poker are 693 to 1 against, for a probability of 1.4 × 10^{−3} (0.14%).
- Mathematics – Poker: The odds of being dealt a flush in poker are 507.8 to 1 against, for a probability of 1.9 × 10^{−3} (0.19%).
- Mathematics – Poker: The odds of being dealt a straight in poker are 253.8 to 1 against, for a probability of 4 × 10^{−3} (0.39%).
- Physics: α = 0.0072973525643(11) is the fine-structure constant.

== 10^{−2} ==
(0.01; one hundredth)

ISO: centi- (c)

- Mathematics – Lottery: The odds of winning any prize in the UK National Lottery, with a single ticket, under the rules as of 2003, are 54 to 1 against, for a probability of about 0.018 (1.8%).
- Mathematics – Poker: The odds of being dealt a three of a kind in poker are 46 to 1 against, for a probability of 0.021 (2.1%).
- Mathematics – Lottery: The odds of winning any prize in the Powerball, with a single ticket, under the rules as of 2015, are 24.87 to 1 against, for a probability of 0.0402 (4.02%).
- Mathematics – Poker: The odds of being dealt two pair in poker are 21 to 1 against, for a probability of 0.048 (4.8%).

== 10^{−1} ==
(0.1; one tenth)

ISO: deci- (d)

- Legal history: 10% was widespread as the tax raised for income or produce in the ancient and medieval period; see tithe.
- Mathematics: 1/3 ≈ 0.333333333, which is the first repeating decimal with the form 1/n.
- Mathematics – Poker: The odds of being dealt only one pair in poker are about 5 to 2 against (2.37 to 1), for a probability of 0.42 (42%).
- Mathematics – Poker: The odds of being dealt no pair in poker are nearly 1 to 2, for a probability of 0.5 (50%).
- Mathematics: ln 2 ≈ 0.693147181
- Computing: 0.99951172 is approximately equal to the largest value less than one that can be represented in the IEEE half-precision floating-point format.
- Computing: 0.999999940395355225 is approximately equal to the largest value less than one that can be represented in the IEEE single-precision floating-point format.
- Computing: 0.9999999999999998890 is approximately equal to the largest value less than one that can be represented in the IEEE double-precision floating-point format.
- Computing: 0.9999999999999999999999999999999999037 is approximately equal to the largest value less than one that can be represented in the IEEE quadruple-precision floating-point format.
- Computing: 0.999999999999999999999999999999999999999999999999999999999999999999999995472 is approximately equal to the largest value less than one that can be represented in the IEEE octuple-precision floating-point format.

== 10^{0} ==
Eight confirmed planets of the Solar System

(1; one)

- Demography: The population of Monowi, an incorporated village in Nebraska, United States, was one in 2010.
- Religion: One is the number of gods in Judaism, Christianity, and Islam (monotheistic religions).
- Computing – Unicode: One character is assigned to the Lisu Supplement Unicode block, the fewest of any public-use Unicode block as of Unicode 15.0 (2022).
- Mathematics: 1 is the only natural number (not including 0) that is not prime or composite.
- Computing: 1.00000000000000000000000000000000000000000000000000000000000000000000000906 is approximately equal to the smallest value greater than one that can be represented in the IEEE octuple-precision floating-point format.
- Computing: 1.0000000000000000000000000000000001926 is approximately equal to the smallest value greater than one that can be represented in the IEEE quadruple-precision floating-point format.
- Computing: 1.0000000000000002 is approximately equal to the smallest value greater than one that can be represented in the IEEE double-precision floating-point format.
- Computing: 1.00000011920928955 is approximately equal to the smallest value greater than one that can be represented in the IEEE single-precision floating-point format.
- Computing: 1.00097656 is approximately equal to the smallest value greater than one that can be represented in the IEEE half-precision floating-point format.
- Motorsport: 1.07 (107%) is the upper limit, on a dry track, for the ratio between the duration of a Formula One Grand Prix entrant's fastest qualifying lap and that of the polesitter's fastest qualifying lap, above which the entrant fails to qualify for the race unless specially permitted.
- Mathematics: ^{3}√2 ≈ 1.259921049894873165, the length of a side of a cube with a volume of 2.
- Mathematics: If the Riemann hypothesis is true, Mills' constant is approximately 1.3063778838630806904686144926... (sequence A051021 in the OEIS).
- Mathematics: √2 ≈ 1.414213562373095049, the ratio of the diagonal of a square to its side length.
- Mathematics: $\sqrt[3]{4}$ ≈ 1.587 401 051 968 2, the length of a cube with a volume of 4.
- Mathematics: φ ≈ 1.618033988749894848, the golden ratio.
- Mathematics: √3 ≈ 1.732050807568877293, the ratio of the diagonal of a unit cube.
- Mathematics: the number system understood by most computers, the binary system, uses 2 digits: 0 and 1.
- Mathematics: √4 = 2, the ratio of a diagonal of a unit tesseract.
- Mathematics: √5 ≈ 2.236 067 9775, the correspondent to the diagonal of a rectangle whose side lengths are 1 and 2.
- Mathematics: √2 + 1 ≈ 2.414213562373095049, the silver ratio; the ratio of the smaller of the two quantities to the larger quantity is the same as the ratio of the larger quantity to the sum of the smaller quantity and twice the larger quantity.
- Mathematics: √6 ≈ 2.449 489 7428, the ratio of one of the longest diagonals of a double cube to one of its shortest side lengths.
- Mathematics: e ≈ 2.718281828459045235, the base of the natural logarithm.
- Mathematics: the number system understood by ternary computers, the ternary system, uses 3 digits: 0, 1, and 2.
- Religion: Three persons of God in the Christian Trinity.
- Mathematics: π ≈ 3.141592653589793238, the ratio of a circle's circumference to its diameter.
- Religion: the Four Noble Truths in Buddhism.
- Human scale: There are five digits on a human hand, and five toes on a human foot.
- Religion: the Five Pillars of Islam.
- Mathematics: 6 is the smallest perfect number.
- Mathematics: 𝜏 ≈ 6.283185307179586476, the ratio of a circle's circumference to its radius.
- Biology: 7 ± 2, in cognitive science, George A. Miller's estimate of the number of objects that can be simultaneously held in human working memory.
- Music: 7 notes in a major or minor scale.
- Astronomy: 8 confirmed planets in the Solar System: Mercury, Venus, Earth, Mars, Jupiter, Saturn, Uranus, and Neptune.
- Biology – Spider anatomy: Eight jointed legs of a spider.
- Religion: the Noble Eightfold Path in Buddhism.
- Literature: 9 circles of Hell in the Inferno by Dante Alighieri.
- Mathematics: 9 is the first odd number that is composite.

== 10^{1} ==
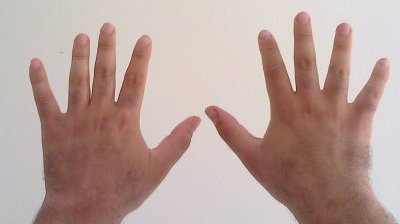
Ten digits on two human hands

(10; ten)

ISO: deca- (da)

- Demography: The population of Pesnopoy, a village in Bulgaria, was 10 in 2007.
- Human scale: There are 10 digits on a pair of human hands, and 10 toes on a pair of human feet.
- Mathematics: The decimal system has 10 digits: 0, 1, 2, 3, 4, 5, 6, 7, 8, 9.
- Religion: the Ten Commandments in the Abrahamic religions.
- Mathematics: 11 is the first prime exponent that does not yield a Mersenne prime.
- Music: There are 12 notes in the chromatic scale.
- Astrology: There are 12 zodiac signs, each one representing part of the annual path of the sun's movement across the night sky.
- Computing – Microsoft Windows: Twelve successive consumer versions of Windows NT have been released as of December 2021.
- Culture: 13 is considered an "unlucky" number in Western superstition.
- Dates: 14 – The nth day of February on which Valentine's Day is celebrated in most countries.
- Music: Composers Ludwig van Beethoven and Dmitri Shostakovich both completed and numbered 15 string quartets in their lifetimes.
- Linguistics: The Finnish language has 15 noun cases.
- Mathematics: The hexadecimal system, a common number system used in computer programming, uses 16 digits where the last 6 are typically represented by letters: 0, 1, 2, 3, 4, 5, 6, 7, 8, 9, A, B, C, D, E, F.
- Computing – Unicode: The minimum possible size of a Unicode block is 16 contiguous code points (i.e., U+abcde0 - U+abcdeF).
- Culture: 17 is considered ill-fated in Italy and other countries of Greek and Latin origins.
- Computing – UTF-16/Unicode: There are 17 addressable planes in UTF-16, and, thus, as Unicode is limited to the UTF-16 code space, 17 valid planes in Unicode.
- Sports – Golf: 18 holes in a standard round of golf.
- Literature: 19 is employed as a mysterious and important number in books The Dark Tower: The Gunslinger, The Dark Tower V: Wolves of the Calla, The Dark Tower VI: Song of Susannah, The Dark Tower VII: The Dark Tower, and The Wind Through the Keyhole by Stephen King's eight-book epic The Dark Tower saga.
- Mathematics: The maximal number of face turns needed to solve any instance of the Rubik's Cube is 20.
- Science fiction: The 23 enigma plays a prominent role in the plot of The Illuminatus! Trilogy by Robert Shea and Robert Anton Wilson.
- Mathematics: e^{π} ≈ 23.140692633
- Music: There is a combined total of 24 major and minor keys, also the number of works in some musical cycles of J. S. Bach, Frédéric Chopin, Alexander Scriabin, and Dmitri Shostakovich.
- Alphabetic writing: There are 26 letters in the Latin-derived English alphabet (excluding letters found only in foreign loanwords).
- Motorsport: A maximum of 26 entrants are allowed to start a Formula One Grand Prix.
- Mathematics: 28 is the second perfect number.
- Mathematics: 30 is the smallest sphenic number.
- Mathematics: 2^{5} = 32 is the largest known power of two with all decimal digits being prime.
- Mathematics: 36 is the smallest number which is a perfect power but not a prime power.
- History: 39 is considered unlucky in Afghanistan, due to the belief that it is associated with pimps. See Curse of 39.
- Science fiction: The number 42, in the novel The Hitchhiker's Guide to the Galaxy by Douglas Adams, is the Answer to the Ultimate Question of Life, the Universe, and Everything which is calculated by an enormous supercomputer over a period of 7.5 million years.
- Biology: A human cell typically contains 46 chromosomes.
- Phonology: There are 47 phonemes in English phonology in Received Pronunciation.
- Syllabic writing: There are 49 letters in each of the two kana syllabaries (hiragana and katakana) used to represent Japanese (not counting letters representing sound patterns that have never occurred in Japanese).
- Geography – United States: There are 50 U.S. states.
- Chess: Either player in a chess game can claim a draw if 50 consecutive moves are made by each side without any captures or pawn moves.
- Chess: A chessboard has 64 squares.
- Culture: 69 is a slang term for reciprocal oral sex.
- Mathematics: 70 is the smallest weird number.
- Mathematics: 72 is the smallest Achilles number.
- Demography: The population of Nassau Island, part of the Cook Islands, was around 78 in 2016.
- Syllabic writing: There are 85 letters in the modern version of the Cherokee syllabary.
- Music: Typically, there are 88 keys on a grand piano.
- Chemistry: 94 chemical elements occur naturally on Earth.
- Computing – ASCII: There are 95 printable characters in the ASCII character set.

== 10^{2} ==
128 ASCII characters

(100; hundred)

ISO: hecto- (h)

- European history: Groupings of 100 homesteads were a common administrative unit in Northern Europe and Great Britain (see Hundred (county division)).
- Music: There are 104 numbered symphonies of Franz Josef Haydn.
- Religion: 108 is a sacred number in Hinduism.
- Chemistry: 118 chemical elements have been discovered or synthesized as of 2016.
- Computing – Computational limit of an 8-bit CPU: 127 is equal to 2^{7}−1, and as such is the largest number which can fit into a signed (two's complement) 8-bit integer on a computer.
- Computing – ASCII: There are 128 characters in the ASCII character set, including nonprintable control characters.
- Videogames: There are 151 Pokémon in the first generation.
- Phonology: The Taa language is estimated to have between 130 and 164 distinct phonemes.
- Political science: There were 193 member states of the United Nations as of 2011.
- Mathematics: 200 is the smallest base 10 unprimeable number – it cannot be turned into a prime number by changing just one of its digits to any other digit.
- Computing: A GIF image (or an 8-bit image) supports maximum 256 (2^{8}) colors.
- Mathematics: 257 is the fourth Fermat prime.
- Computing – Unicode: There are 327 different Unicode blocks as of Unicode 15.0 (2022).
- Mathematics: 383 is the third Woodall prime.
- Computing – HTTP: 404 is the HTTP status code for Not Found.
- Culture: 420 is a code-term that refers to the consumption of cannabis.
- Mathematics: 496 is the third perfect number.
- Mathematics: 512 is the third Dudeney number, and the first one besides the trivial cases of 0 and 1.
- Mathematics: 563 is the largest known Wilson prime.
- Aviation: 583 people died in the 1977 Tenerife airport disaster, the deadliest accident in the history of civil aviation.
- Religion: the 613 Commandments in the Torah in Judaism.
- Music: The largest number (626) in the Köchel catalogue of works of Wolfgang Amadeus Mozart.
- Religion: 666 is the number of the beast from the Book of Revelation.
- Politics: There are 720 seats in the European Parliament, the largest democratically elected legislative house as of 2026.
- Demography: Vatican City, the least populous independent country, has an approximate population of 800 as of 2018.
- Communications: 911 is the emergency telephone number for the United States and Canada.

== 10^{3} ==
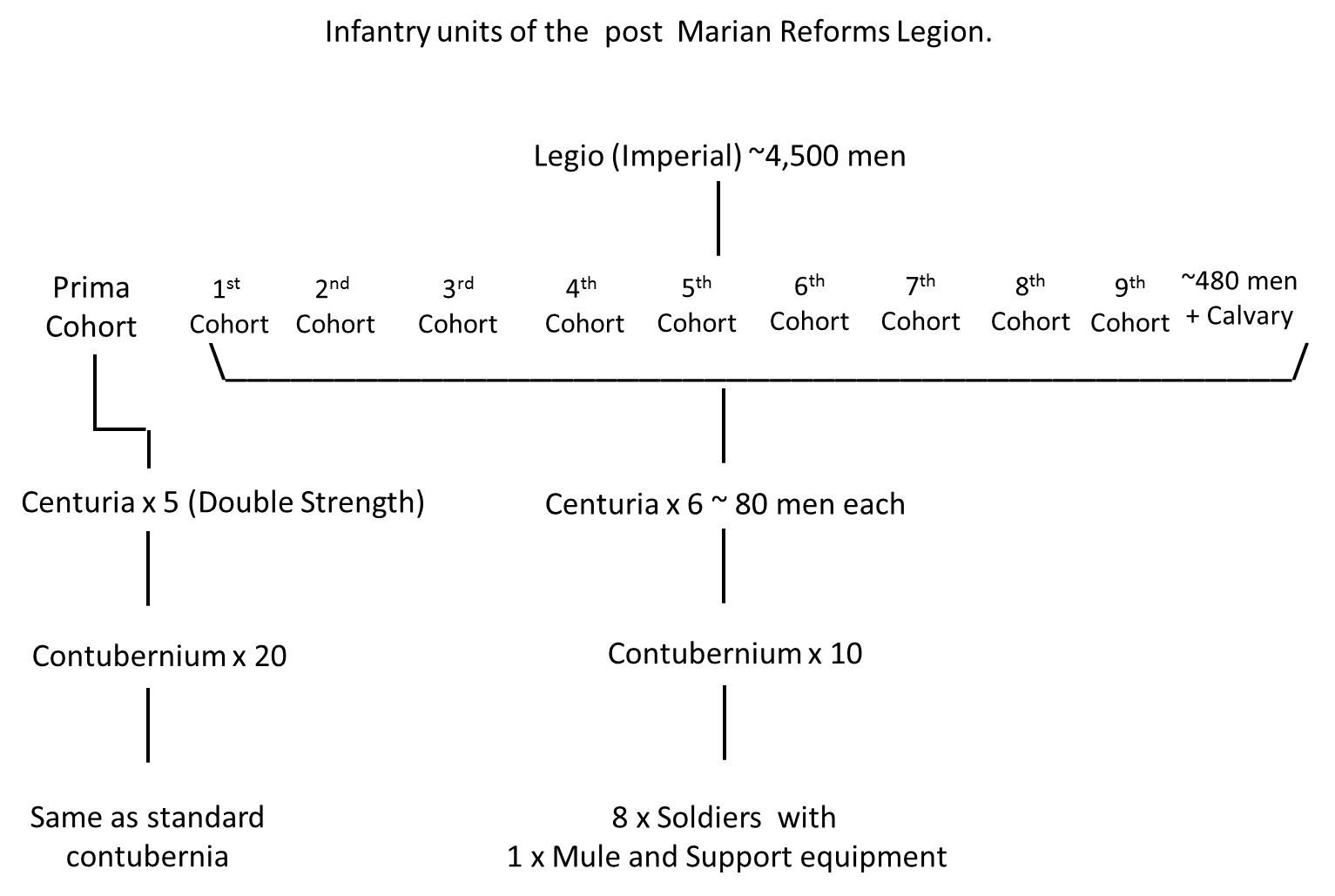
Roman legion (precise size varies)

(1000; thousand)

ISO: kilo- (k)

- Scale: 1,000 – the scale factor of most metric prefixes.
- Mathematics: 1,023 is the highest number one can count to on one's fingers using binary.
- Computing: 1,024 – the number of bytes in a kibibyte, and bits in a kibibit.
- Videogames: There are 1,025 Pokémon up to the ninth and latest generation.
- Demography: Mata Utu, the capital of Wallis and Futuna, has a population of 1,029 as of 2018.
- Mathematics: 1,093 is the smallest Wieferich prime.
- Music: 1,128: number of known extant works by Johann Sebastian Bach recognized in the Bach-Werke-Verzeichnis as of 2017.
- Ocean liners: Up to 1,635 people died from the Titanic sinking of April 1912.
- Mathematics: 1,729 is the first nontrivial taxicab number, expressed as the sum of two cubic numbers in two different ways. It is known as the Ramanujan number or Hardy–Ramanujan number after G. H. Hardy and Srinivasa Ramanujan.
- Physics: μ = m_{p}/m_{e} = 1836.152673426(32) is the proton-to-electron mass ratio.
- Typesetting: 2,000–3,000 letters on a typical typed page of text.
- Mathematics: 2^{11} − 1 = 2,047 = 23 × 89 is the smallest composite Mersenne number with prime exponent n.
- Mathematics: 2^{11} = 2,048 is the largest known power of two with all even digits.
- Computing: 2,048 (2^{11}) – number until which all integer values can exactly be represented in IEEE half-precision floating-point format.
- Mathematics: 2,520 (5×7×8×9 or 2^{3}×3^{2}×5×7) is the least common multiple of every positive integer under (and including) 10.
- Demographics – Wealth: There are 2,781 billionaires worldwide as of April 2024.
- Terrorism: 2,996 persons (including 19 terrorists) died in the terrorist attacks of September 11, 2001.
- Biology: the DNA of the simplest viruses has 3,000 base pairs.
- Geography – United States: There are 3,244 counties and county equivalents in the United States. (Note: At the time of the most recent (2020) census, 3,143 counties and equivalents were recorded in the 50 states and the District of Columbia, with another 100 county equivalents recorded in the territories (when the nine Minor Outlying Islands are included). Since that time, Connecticut's eight historical counties have been replaced with nine councils of government or “planning regions” which are considered by the United States Census Bureau as being county equivalents, resulting in a net gain of one county equivalent.)
- Mathematics: 3,511 is the largest known Wieferich prime.
- Military history: 4,200 (Republic) or 5,200 (Empire) was the standard size of a Roman legion.
- Linguistics: Estimates for the linguistic diversity of living human languages or dialects range between 5,000 and 10,000. (SIL Ethnologue in 2009 listed 6,909 known living languages.)
- Mathematics: 7! = 5,040 is the largest factorial that is also a highly composite number.
- Culture: 5,040 is mentioned by Plato in the Laws as one of the most important numbers for the city.
- Mathematics: 6,174 is a Kaprekar's Constant. Any four-digit number (in base 10) with at least two distinct digits will reach that number within seven iterations.
- Astronomy – Catalogues: There are 7,840 deep-sky objects in the NGC Catalogue from 1888.
- Mathematics: 8,128 is the fourth perfect number.
- Mathematics: 2^{13} − 1 = 8,191 is the fifth Mersenne prime.
- Lexicography: 8,674 unique words in the Hebrew Bible.

== 10^{4} ==
(10000; ten thousand or a myriad)

- Biology: Each neuron in the human brain is estimated to connect to 10,000 others.
- Demography: The population of Tuvalu was 10,643 in 2022.
- Lexicography: 14,500 unique English words occur in the King James Version of the Bible.
- Mathematics: 15,511 is the third Motzkin prime.
- Zoology: There are approximately 17,500 distinct butterfly species known.
- Mathematics: 19,683 is the largest Dudeney number.
- Language: There are 20,000–40,000 distinct Chinese characters in more than occasional use.
- Biology: Each human being is estimated to have 20,000 coding genes.
- Grammar: Each regular verb in Cherokee can have 21,262 inflected forms.
- War: 22,717 Union and Confederate soldiers were killed, wounded, or missing in the Battle of Antietam, the bloodiest single day of battle in American history.
- Computing – Computational limit of a 16-bit CPU: 32,767 is equal to 2^{15}−1, and as such is the largest number which can fit into a signed (two's complement) 16-bit integer on a computer.
- Mathematics: There are 41,472 possible permutations of the Gear Cube.
- Computing – Unicode: 42,720 characters are encoded in CJK Unified Ideographs Extension B, the most of any single public-use Unicode block as of Unicode 15.0 (2022).
- Aviation: As of July 2021, 44,000+ airframes have been built of the Cessna 172, the most-produced aircraft in history.
- Computing: 65,504 is equal to the largest value that can be represented in the IEEE half-precision floating-point format.
- Computing - Fonts: The maximum possible number of glyphs in a TrueType or OpenType font is 65,535 (2^{16}-1), the largest number representable by the 16-bit unsigned integer used to record the total number of glyphs in the font.
- Computing – Unicode: A plane contains 65,536 (2^{16}) code points; this is also the maximum size of a Unicode block, and the total number of code points available in the obsolete UCS-2 encoding.
- Mathematics: 65,537 is the fifth and largest known Fermat prime.
- Memory: As of 2015, the largest number of decimal places of π that have been recited from memory is 70,030.
- Mathematics: 78,557 is conjectured as the first, and smallest Sierpiński number.
- Mathematics: 82,000 is the only known number greater than 1 that can be written in bases from 2 through 5 using only 0s and 1s.
- Mathematics: 87,360 is the fourth unitary perfect number.

== 10^{5} ==
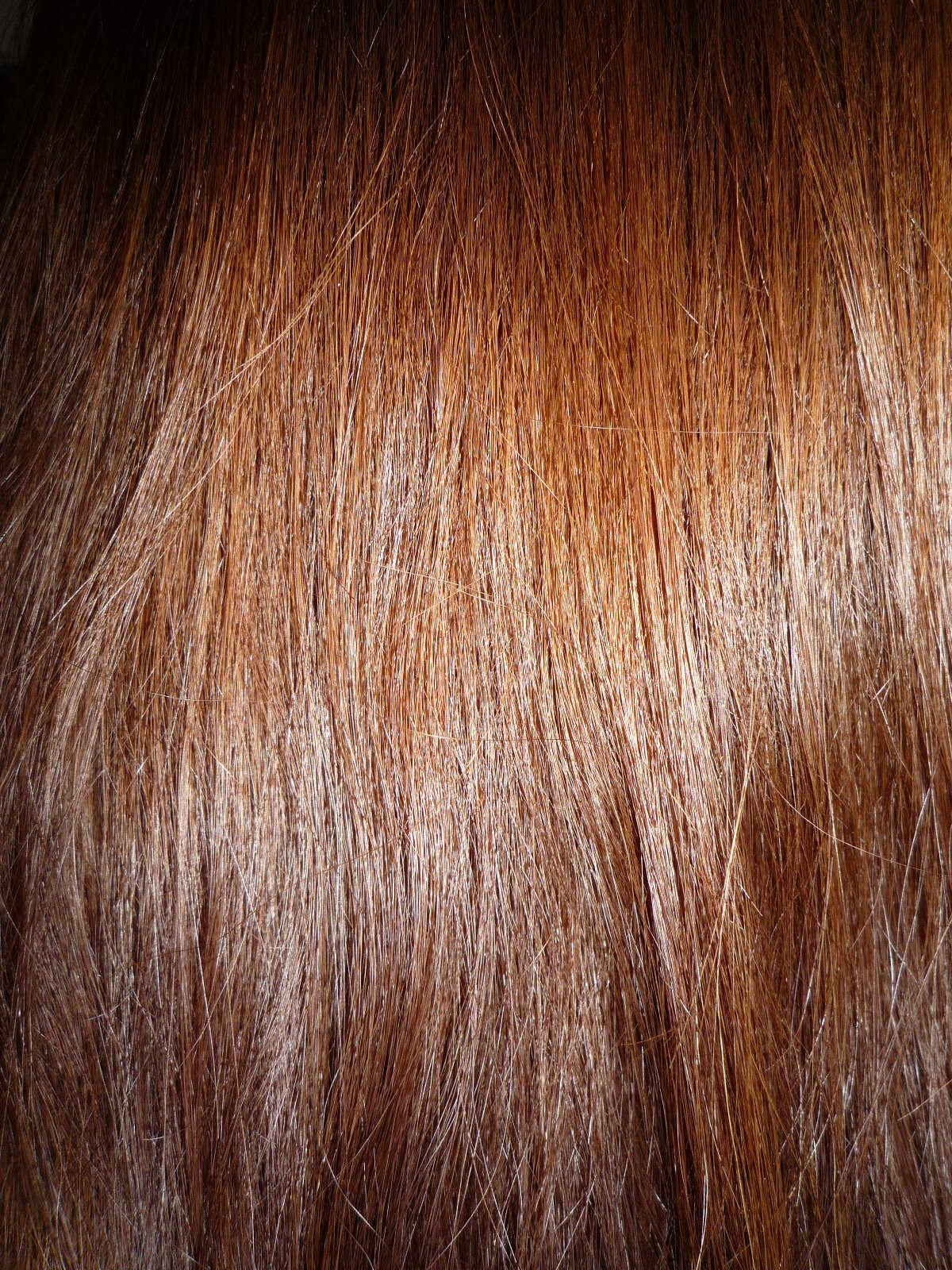
100,000–150,000 strands of human hair

(100000; one hundred thousand or a lakh).

- Biology – Strands of hair on a head: The average human head has about 100,000–150,000 strands of hair.
- Literature: approximately 100,000 verses (shlokas) in the Mahabharata.
- Demography: The population of Saint Vincent and the Grenadines was 109,296 in 2023.
- Mathematics: 2^{17} − 1 = 131,071 is the sixth Mersenne prime. It is the largest nth Mersenne prime with n digits.
- Videogames: 131,072 is the largest possible tile in the video game 2048.
- Mathematics: There are 138,240 possible combinations on the Skewb Diamond.
- Mathematics: 142,857 is the smallest cyclic number in base 10.
- Computing – Unicode: 149,186 characters (including control characters) encoded in Unicode as of version 15.0 (2022).
- Mathematics: 4^{9} = 262,144 is the fourth exponential factorial. The next exponential factorial is 183,231 digits long.
- Literature: 267,000 words in James Joyce's Ulysses.
- Computing – Unicode: 293,168 code points assigned to a Unicode block as of Unicode 15.0.
- Genocide: 300,000 people killed in the Nanjing Massacre.
- Language – English words: The New Oxford Dictionary of English contains about 360,000 definitions for English words.
- Biology – Plants: There are approximately 390,000 distinct plant species known, of which approximately 20% (or 78,000) are at risk of extinction.
- Biology – Flowers: There are approximately 400,000 distinct flower species on Earth.
- Mathematics: 400,000 – The approximate number of entries in The On-Line Encyclopedia of Integer Sequences as of September 2026.
- Mathematics: 2^{19} − 1 = 524,287 is the seventh Mersenne prime.
- Literature: 564,000 words in War and Peace by Leo Tolstoy.
- Literature: 930,000 words in the King James Version of the Bible.
- Mathematics: There are 933,120 possible combinations on the Pyraminx.
- Computing – Unicode: There are 974,530 publicly-assignable code points (i.e., not surrogates, private-use code points, or noncharacters) in Unicode.

== 10^{6} ==
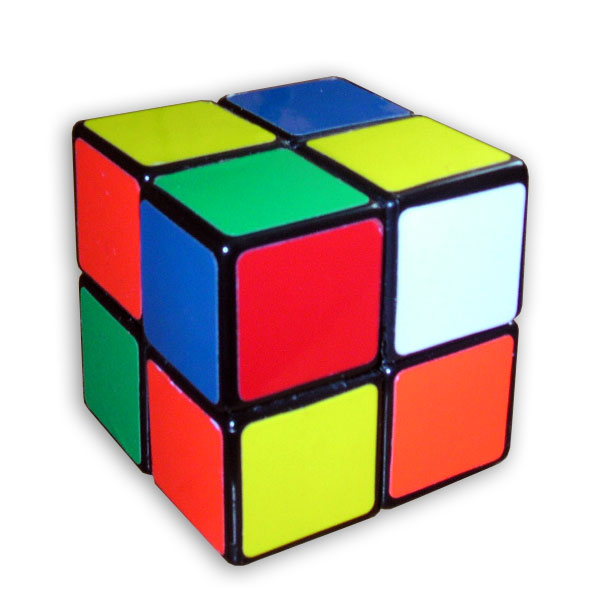
3,674,160 Pocket Cube positions

(1000000; 1000^{2}; long and short scales: one million)

ISO: mega- (M)

- Demography: The population of Abu Dhabi, United Arab Emirates was 1,010,092 in 2020.
- Computing: 1,048,576 – the number of bytes in a mebibyte, and bits in a mebibit.
- Computing – UTF-8: There are 1,112,064 (2^{20} + 2^{16} - 2^{11}) valid UTF-8 sequences (excluding overlong sequences and sequences corresponding to code points used for UTF-16 surrogates or code points beyond U+10FFFF).
- Computing – UTF-16/Unicode: There are 1,114,112 (2^{20} + 2^{16}) distinct values encodable in UTF-16, and, thus (as Unicode is currently limited to the UTF-16 code space), 1,114,112 valid code points in Unicode (1,112,064 scalar values and 2,048 surrogates).
- Ludology – Number of games: Approximately 1,181,019 video games have been created as of 2019.
- Biology – Species: The World Resources Institute claims that approximately 1.4 million species have been named, out of an unknown number of total species (estimates range between 2 and 100 million species). Some scientists give 8.8 million species as an exact figure.
- Genocide: Approximately 800,000–1,500,000 (1.5 million) Armenians were killed in the Armenian genocide.
- Linguistics: The number of possible conjugations for each verb in the Archi language is 1,502,839.
- Computing – UTF-8: 2,164,864 (2^{21} + 2^{16} + 2^{11} + 2^{7}) possible one- to four-byte UTF-8 sequences, if the restrictions on overlong sequences, surrogate code points, and code points beyond U+10FFFF are not adhered to. (Note that not all of these correspond to unique code points.)
- Mathematics – Playing cards: There are 2,598,960 different 5-card poker hands that can be dealt from a standard 52-card deck.
- Mathematics: There are 3,149,280 possible positions for the Skewb.
- Mathematics – Rubik's Cube: 3,674,160 is the number of combinations for the Pocket Cube (2×2×2 Rubik's Cube).
- Geography/Computing – Geographic places: The NIMA GEOnet Names Server contains approximately 3.88 million named geographic features outside the United States, with 5.34 million names. The USGS Geographic Names Information System claims to have almost 2 million physical and cultural geographic features within the United States.
- Computing - Supercomputer hardware: There are 4,981,760 processor cores in the final configuration of the Tianhe-2 supercomputer.
- Genocide: Approximately 5,100,000–6,200,000 Jews were killed in the Holocaust.
- Info – Web sites: As of November 22, 2026, the English Wikipedia contains approximately 7.3 million articles in the English language.

== 10^{7} ==
12,988,816 domino tilings of a checkerboard

(10000000; a crore; long and short scales: ten million)

- Demography: The population of Papua New Guinea was 10,185,363 in 2024.
- Literature: 11,206,310 words in Devta by Mohiuddin Nawab, the longest continuously published story known in the history of literature.
- Genocide: An estimated 12 million persons shipped from Africa to the New World in the Atlantic slave trade.
- Mathematics: 12,988,816 is the number of domino tilings of an 8×8 checkerboard.
- Genocide/Famine: 15 million is an estimated lower bound for the death toll of the 1959–1961 Great Chinese Famine, the deadliest known famine in human history.
- War: 15 to 22 million casualties estimated as a result of World War I.
- Computing: 16,777,216 different colors can be generated using the hex code system in HTML (note that the trichromatic color vision of the human eye can only distinguish between about an estimated 1,000,000 different colors).
- Computing: 16,777,216 (2^{24}) – number until which all integer values can exactly be represented in IEEE single-precision floating-point format.
- Mathematics: There are 19,958,400 possible combinations on the Dino Cube.
- Science fiction: In Isaac Asimov's Galactic Empire, in 22,500 CE, there are 25,000,000 different inhabited planets in the Galactic Empire, all inhabited by humans in Asimov's "human galaxy" scenario.
- Mathematics: 33,550,336 is the fifth perfect number. It is also the smallest multi-digit perfect number whose digit sum is a perfect number.
- Demography: The population of Saudi Arabia was 34,566,328 in 2022.
- Demography: The population of Canada was 36,991,981 in 2021.
- Demography: In 2025, the UN estimated that Jakarta was the world's largest city, with a population of 41,913,860.
- Demographics – Oceania: The population of Oceania was 44,491,724 in 2021.
- Genocide/Famine: 55 million is an estimated upper bound for the death toll of the Great Chinese Famine.
- Literature: Wikipedia contains a total of around 68 million articles in 364 languages as of November 2026.
- Demography: The population of the United Kingdom was 66,940,559 in 2021.
- War: 70 to 85 million casualties estimated as a result of World War II.
- Mathematics: 73,939,133 is the largest right-truncatable prime.
- Demography: The population of Germany was 83,517,030 in 2025.
- Mathematics: 87,539,319 is the third taxicab number.

== 10^{8} ==
(100000000; long and short scales: one hundred million)

- Demography: The population of Vietnam was estimated at 102,300,000 in 2025.
- Internet – YouTube: The number of YouTube channels is estimated to be 113.9 million.
- Info – Books: The British Library holds more than 150 million items. The Library of Congress holds approximately 148 million items. See The Gutenberg Galaxy.
- Video gaming: 160 million PlayStation 2 units (the best-selling video game console in history) have been sold.
- Mathematics: The number of partitions of 100 is 190,569,292.
- Video gaming: As of 2020, approximately 200 million copies of Minecraft (the most-sold video game in history) have been sold.
- Mathematics: More than 215,000,000 mathematical constants are collected on the Plouffe's Inverter as of 2010.
- Mathematics: 275,305,224 is the number of 5×5 normal magic squares, not counting rotations and reflections. This result was found in 1973 by Richard Schroeppel.
- Demography: The population of the United States was 331,449,281 in 2020.
- Mathematics: 358,833,097 stellations of the rhombic triacontahedron.
- Mathematics: There are 406,425,600 possible combinations on the Rubik's Domino.
- Demographics – South America: The population of South America was 434,254,119 in 2021.
- Info – Web sites: As of November 2011, the Netcraft web survey estimates that there are 525,998,433 (526 million) distinct websites.
- Mathematics: 2^{29} = 536,870,912 is the largest power of two with distinct digits.
- Demographics – North America: The population of North America was 592,296,233 in 2021.
- Demographics – Europe: The population of Europe was 745,173,774 in 2021.
- Toys – Lego: Six bricks of 2 × 4 Lego studs can be combined in 915,103,765 ways.
- Astronomy – Cataloged stars: The Guide Star Catalog II has entries on 998,402,801 distinct astronomical objects.

== 10^{9} ==
World population estimates

(1000000000; 1000^{3}; short scale: one billion; long scale: one thousand million, or one milliard)

ISO: giga- (G)

- Computing: 1,073,741,824 – the number of bytes in a gibibyte, and bits in a gibibit.
- Info – Web sites: As of November 22, 2026, the English Wikipedia has been edited approximately 1.4 billion times.
- Transportation – Cars: As of 2018, there are approximately 1.4 billion cars in the world, corresponding to around 18% of the human population.
- Demographics – China: 1,409,670,000 – approximate population of the People's Republic of China in 2023.
- Demographics – India: 1,428,627,663 – approximate population of India in 2023.
- Demographics – Africa: The population of Africa reached 1,430,000,000 sometime in 2023.
- Internet – Google: There are more than 1,500,000,000 active Gmail users globally.
- Internet: Approximately 1,500,000,000 active users were on Facebook as of October 2015.
- Computing – Computational limit of a 32-bit CPU: 2,147,483,647 is equal to 2^{31}−1, and as such is the largest number which can fit into a signed (two's complement) 32-bit integer on a computer.
- Mathematics: 2^{31} − 1 = 2,147,483,647 is the eighth Mersenne prime.
- Computing – UTF-8: 2,147,483,648 (2^{31}) possible code points (U+0000 - U+7FFFFFFF) in the pre-2003 version of UTF-8 (including five- and six-byte sequences), before the UTF-8 code space was limited to the much smaller set of values encodable in UTF-16.
- Biology – base pairs in the genome: approximately 3.3×10^{9} base pairs in the human genome.
- Linguistics: 3,400,000,000 – the total number of speakers of Indo-European languages, of which 2,400,000,000 are native speakers; the other 1,000,000,000 speak Indo-European languages as a second language.
- Mathematics and computing: 4,294,967,295 (2^{32} − 1), the product of the five known Fermat primes and the maximum value for a 32-bit unsigned integer in computing.
- Computing – IPv4: 4,294,967,296 (2^{32}) possible unique IP addresses.
- Computing: 4,294,967,296 – the number of bytes in 4 gibibytes; in computation, 32-bit computers can directly access 2^{32} units (bytes) of address space, which leads directly to the 4-gigabyte limit on main memory.
- Mathematics: 4,294,967,297 is a Fermat number and semiprime. It is the smallest number of the form $2^{2^n}+1$ which is not a prime number.
- Demographics – Asia: The population of Asia was 4,694,576,167 in 2021.
- Demographics – world population: 8,019,876,189 – Estimated population for the world as of 1 January 2024.
- Mathematics: 8,589,869,056 is the sixth perfect number.
- Measurement: The second is defined as the duration of 9,192,631,770 transitions of the Cs-133 atom.
- Mathematics: 9,814,072,356 is the largest perfect power that contains no repeated digits in base ten.

== 10^{10} ==
(10000000000; short scale: ten billion; long scale: ten thousand million, or ten milliard)

- Biology – bacteria in the human body: There are roughly 10^{10} bacteria in the human mouth.
- Computing: 10,000,000,000 (10^{10}) – number up to which all powers of 10 can be exactly represented in IEEE single-precision floating-point format.
- Mathematics: 32,212,254,719 is the fourth Woodall prime.
- Mathematics: There are 49,487,367,289 groups of order 1,024, up to isomorphism.
- Mathematics: 51,001,180,160 is the largest known triperfect number.
- Computing – web pages: approximately 5.6×10^{10} web pages indexed by Google as of 2010.

== 10^{11} ==
(100000000000; short scale: one hundred billion; long scale: hundred thousand million, or hundred milliard)

- Astronomy: There are 100 billion planets located in the Milky Way.
- Astronomy – stars in our galaxy: of the order of 10^{11} stars in the Milky Way galaxy.
- Biology – Neurons in the brain: approximately (1±0.2) × 10^{11} neurons in the human brain.
- Paleodemography – Number of humans that have ever lived: approximately (1.2±0.3) × 10^{11} live births of anatomically modern humans since the beginning of the Upper Paleolithic.
- Mathematics: 137,438,691,328 is the seventh perfect number.
- Mathematics: 198,585,576,189 is the only known Descartes number.
- Mathematics – Nine-Colour Cube: 268,240,896,000 is the number of combinations for the Nine-Colour Cube.
- Medicine: The United States Food and Drug Administration requires a minimum of 3 × 10^{11} (300 billion) platelets per apheresis unit.
- Mathematics: 608,981,813,029 is the smallest number for which there are more primes of the form 3k + 1 than of the form 3k + 2 up to the number.

== 10^{12} ==
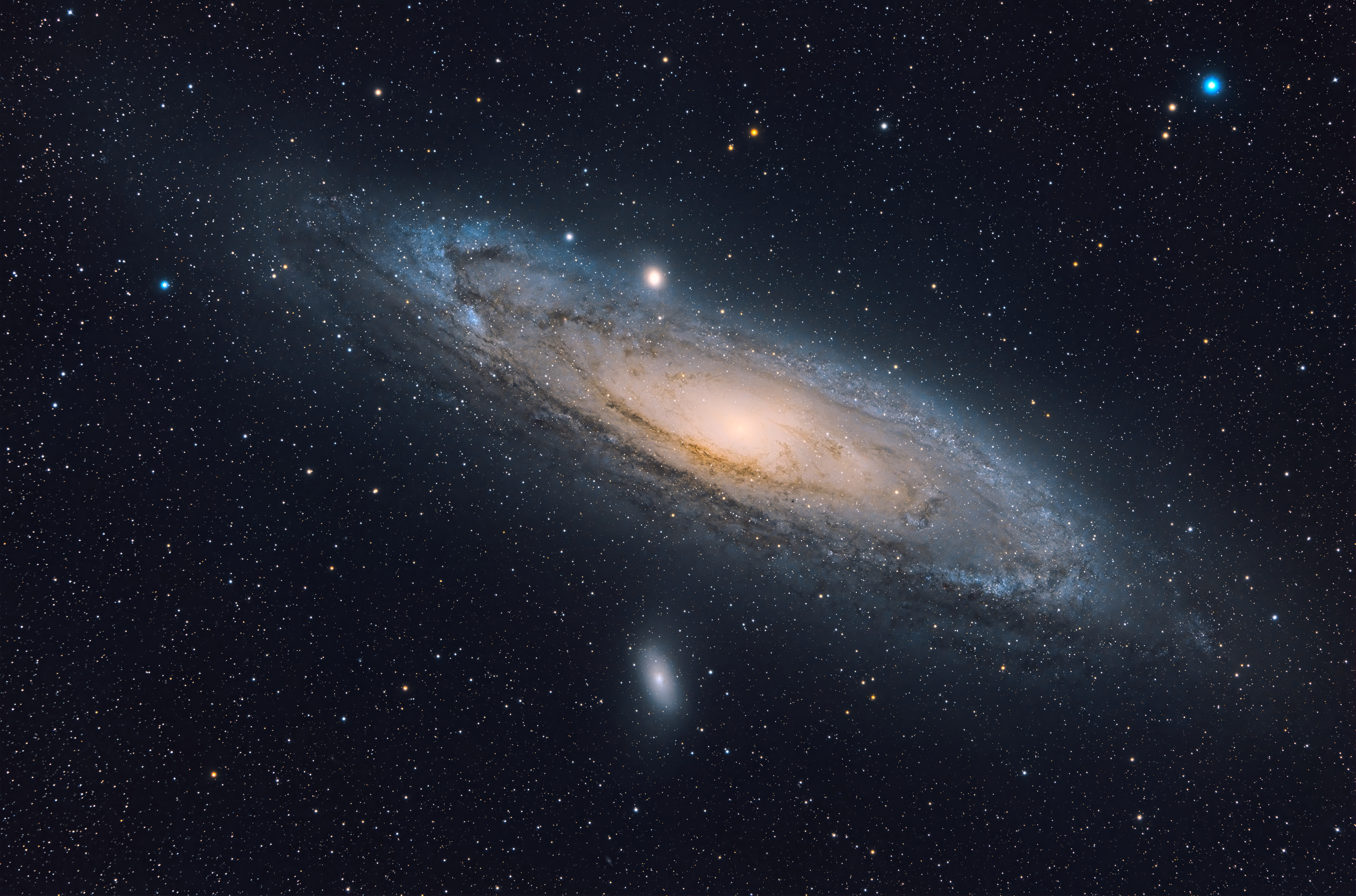
10^{12} stars in the Andromeda Galaxy

(1000000000000; 1000^{4}; short scale: one trillion; long scale: one billion)

ISO: tera- (T)

- Astronomy: Andromeda Galaxy, which is part of the same Local Group as our galaxy, contains about 10^{12} stars.
- Biology – Bacteria on the human body: The surface of the human body houses roughly 10^{12} bacteria.
- Computing: 1,099,511,627,776 – the number of bytes in a tebibyte, and bits in a tebibit.
- Astronomy – Galaxies: A 2016 estimate says there are 2 × 10^{12} galaxies in the observable universe.
- Biology: An estimate says there were 3.04 × 10^{12} trees on Earth in 2015.
- Mathematics: 6,963,472,309,248 is the fourth taxicab number.
- Mathematics: 7,625,597,484,987 – a number that often appears when dealing with powers of 3. It can be expressed as $19683^3$, $27^9$, $3^{27}$, $3^{3^3}$ and ^{3}3 or when using Knuth's up-arrow notation it can be expressed as $3 \uparrow\uparrow 3$ and $3 \uparrow\uparrow\uparrow 2$.

== 10^{13} ==
(10000000000000; short scale: ten trillion; long scale: ten billion)

- Mathematics: 10^{13} – The approximate number of known non-trivial zeros of the Riemann zeta function as of 2004.
- Mathematics: 5^{19} = 19,073,486,328,125 is the first power of five to contain all decimal digits.
- Biology – Blood cells in the human body: The average human body is estimated to have (2.5 ± .5) × 10^{13} red blood cells.
- Mathematics – Known digits of π: As of March 2019, the number of known digits of π is 31,415,926,535,897 (the integer part of π×10^{13}).
- Mathematics – Digits of e: As of December 2023, the number e has been calculated to 35,000,000,000,000 digits.
- Mathematics: 2^{46} = 70,368,744,177,664 is the first power of two that begins with a 7.

== 10^{14} ==
(100000000000000; short scale: one hundred trillion; long scale: one hundred billion)

- Biology – approximately 10^{14} synapses in the human brain.
- Biology – Cells in the human body: The human body consists of roughly 10^{14} cells, of which only 10^{13} are human. The remaining 90% non-human cells (though much smaller and constituting much less mass) are bacteria, which mostly reside in the gastrointestinal tract, although the skin is also covered in bacteria.
- Mathematics: The first case of exactly 18 prime numbers between multiples of 100 is 122,853,771,370,900 + n, for n = 1, 3, 7, 19, 21, 27, 31, 33, 37, 49, 51, 61, 69, 73, 87, 91, 97, 99.
- Cryptography: 150,738,274,937,250 configurations of the plug-board of the Enigma machine used by the Germans in WW2 to encode and decode messages by cipher.
- Computing – MAC-48: 281,474,976,710,656 (2^{48}) possible unique physical addresses.
- Mathematics: 953,467,954,114,363 is the fourth and largest known Motzkin prime.

== 10^{15} ==
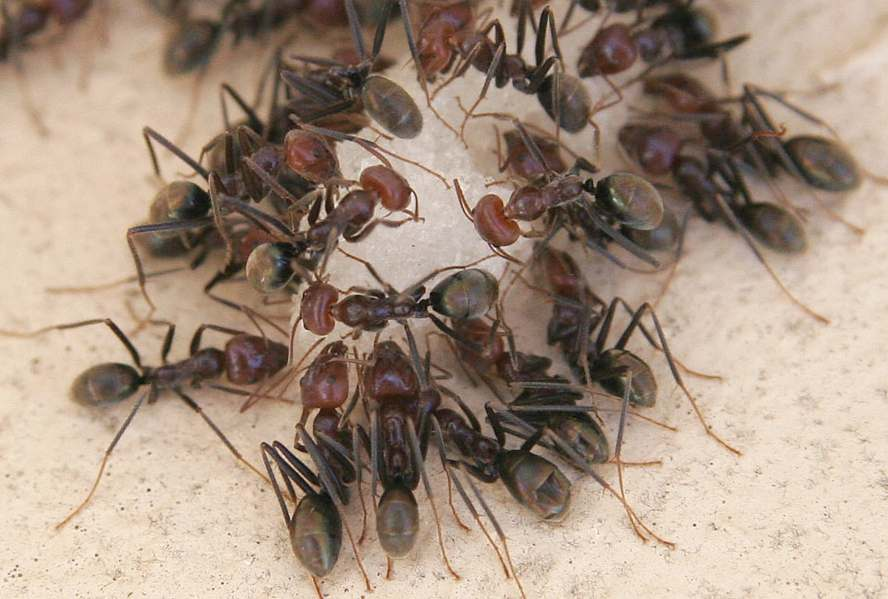
10^{15} to 10^{16} ants on Earth

(1000000000000000; 1000^{5}; short scale: one quadrillion; long scale: one thousand billion, or one billiard)

ISO: peta- (P)

- Biology – Insects: 1,000,000,000,000,000 to 10,000,000,000,000,000 (10^{15} to 10^{16}) – The estimated total number of ants on Earth alive at any one time (their biomass is approximately equal to the total biomass of the human species).
- Computing: 1,125,899,906,842,624 – the number of bytes in a pebibyte, and bits in a pebibit.
- Computing: 9,007,199,254,740,881 – the largest prime number that can be represented in IEEE double-precision floating-point format.
- Computing: 9,007,199,254,740,992 (2^{53}) – number until which all integer values can exactly be represented in IEEE double-precision floating-point format.

== 10^{16} ==
(10000000000000000; short scale: ten quadrillion; long scale: ten thousand billion, or ten billiard)

- Mathematics: 48,988,659,276,962,496 is the fifth taxicab number.
- Science fiction: In Isaac Asimov's Galactic Empire, in what we call 22,500 CE, there are 25,000,000 different inhabited planets in the Galactic Empire, all inhabited by humans in Asimov's "human galaxy" scenario, each with an average population of 2,000,000,000, thus yielding a total Galactic Empire population of approximately 50,000,000,000,000,000.
- Cryptography: There are 2^{56} = 72,057,594,037,927,936 different possible keys in the obsolete 56-bit DES symmetric cipher.

== 10^{17} ==
(100000000000000000; short scale: one hundred quadrillion; long scale: one hundred thousand billion, or one hundred billiard)

- Science fiction: There are approximately 100,000,000,000,000,000 (10^{17}) sentient beings in the Star Wars galaxy.
- Mathematics – Ramanujan's constant: e^{π√163} = 262537412640768743.99999999999925007259... (sequence A060295 in the OEIS). This number is very close to the integer 640320^{3} + 744. See 10^{−15}.
- Physical culture: Highest amount of bytes lifted by a human is 318,206,335,271,488,635 by Hafþór Júlíus Björnsson.

== 10^{18} ==
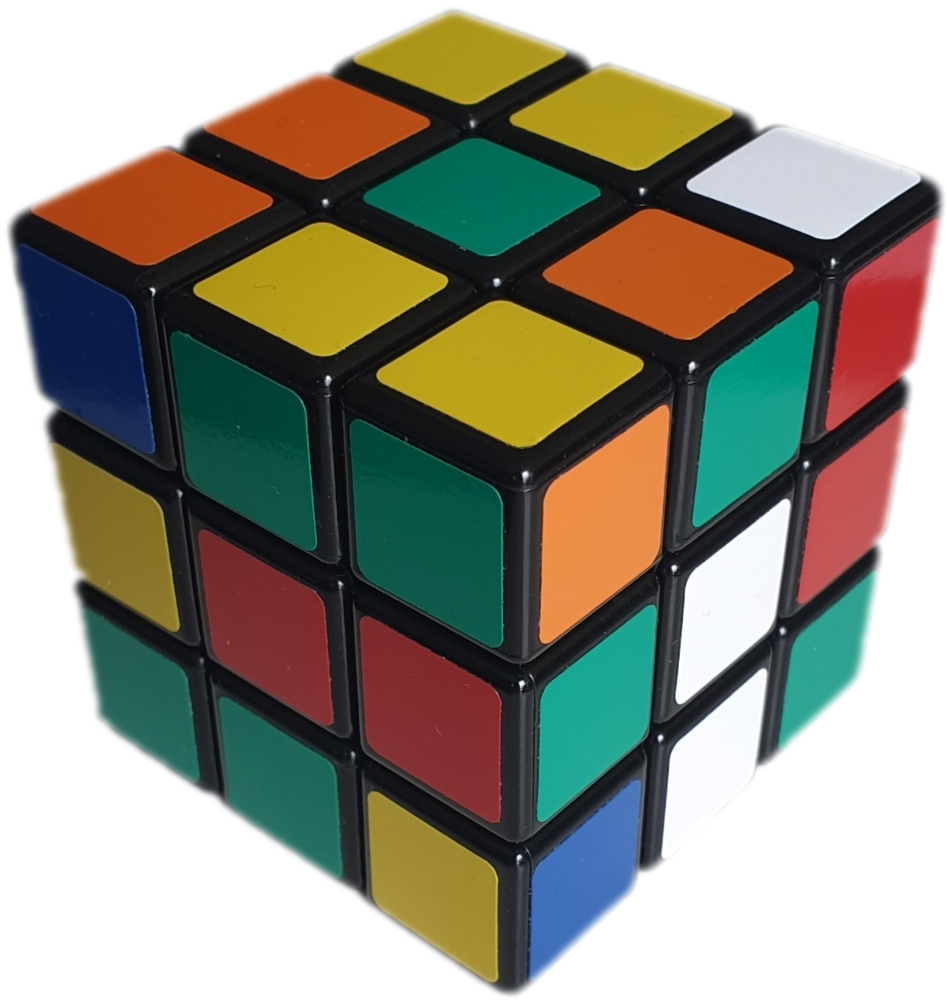
≈4.33×10^{19} Rubik's Cube positions

(1000000000000000000; 1000^{6}; short scale: one quintillion; long scale: one trillion)

ISO: exa- (E)

- Computing: 1,152,921,504,606,846,976 – the number of bytes in a exbibyte, and bits in a exbibit.
- Mathematics: The first case of exactly 19 prime numbers between multiples of 100 is 1,468,867,005,116,420,800 + n, for n = 1, 3, 7, 9, 21, 31, 37, 39, 43, 49, 51, 63, 67, 69, 73, 79, 81, 87, 93.
- Mathematics: 2,305,843,008,139,952,128 is the eighth perfect number.
- Mathematics: 2^{61} − 1 = 2,305,843,009,213,693,951 (≈2.31×10^{18}) is the ninth Mersenne prime. It was determined to be prime in 1883 by Ivan Mikheevich Pervushin. This number is sometimes called Pervushin's number.
- Mathematics: Goldbach's conjecture has been verified for all n ≤ 4×10^{18} by a project which computed all prime numbers up to that limit.
- Mathematics: 3^{39} = 4,052,555,153,018,976,267 is the first power of three to contain all decimal digits.
- Computing – Manufacturing: An estimated 6×10^{18} transistors were produced worldwide in 2008.
- Computing – Computational limit of a 64-bit CPU: 9,223,372,036,854,775,807 (about 9.22×10^{18}) is equal to 2^{63}−1, and as such is the largest number which can fit into a signed (two's complement) 64-bit integer on a computer.
- Mathematics – NCAA basketball tournament: There are 9,223,372,036,854,775,808 (2^{63}) possible ways to enter the bracket.
- Mathematics – Bases: 9,439,829,801,208,141,318 (≈9.44×10^{18}) is the 10th and (by conjecture) largest number with more than one digit that can be written from base 2 to base 18 using only the digits 0 to 9, meaning the digits for 10 to 17 are not needed in bases greater than 10.

== 10^{19} ==
(10000000000000000000; short scale: ten quintillion; long scale: ten trillion)

- Biology – Insects: It has been estimated that the insect population of the Earth is about 10^{19}.
- Mathematics – Answer to the wheat and chessboard problem: When doubling the grains of wheat on each successive square of a chessboard, beginning with one grain of wheat on the first square, the final number of grains of wheat on all 64 squares of the chessboard when added up is 2^{64}−1 = 18,446,744,073,709,551,615 (≈1.84×10^{19}).
- Mathematics – Legends: The Tower of Brahma legend tells about a Hindu temple containing a large room with three posts, on one of which are 64 golden discs, and the object of the mathematical game is for the Brahmins in this temple to move all of the discs to another pole so that they are in the same order, never placing a larger disc above a smaller disc, moving only one at a time. Using the simplest algorithm for moving the disks, it would take 2^{64}−1 = 18,446,744,073,709,551,615 (≈1.84×10^{19}) turns to complete the task (the same number as the wheat and chessboard problem above).
- Computing – IPv6: 18,446,744,073,709,551,616 (2^{64}; ≈1.84×10^{19}) possible unique /64 subnetworks.
- Mathematics – Rubik's Cube: There are 43,252,003,274,489,856,000 (≈4.33×10^{19}) different positions of a 3×3×3 Rubik's Cube.
- Password strength: Usage of the 95-character set found on standard computer keyboards for a 10-character password yields a computationally intractable 59,873,693,923,837,890,625 (95^{10}, approximately 5.99×10^{19}) permutations.
- Internet – YouTube: There are 73,786,976,294,838,206,464 (2^{66}; ≈7.38×10^{19}) possible YouTube video URLs.

== 10^{20} ==
(100000000000000000000; short scale: one hundred quintillion; long scale: one hundred trillion)

- Economics: Hyperinflation in Zimbabwe estimated in February 2009 by some economists at 10 sextillion percent, or a factor of 10^{20}.
- Mathematics: 2^{67} − 1 = 147,573,952,589,676,412,927 is the first Mersenne prime that is composite and listed to be prime. Édouard Lucas demonstrated that the number was composite in 1876 without finding a factor.
- Mathematics: 2^{68} = 295,147,905,179,352,825,856 is the first power of two to contain all decimal digits.

== 10^{21} ==
≈6.7×10^{21} Sudoku grids

(1000000000000000000000; 1000^{7}; short scale: one sextillion; long scale: one thousand trillion, or one trilliard)

ISO: zetta- (Z)

- Geo – Grains of sand: All the world's beaches combined have been estimated to hold roughly 10^{21} grains of sand.
- Computing: 1,180,591,620,717,411,303,424 – the number of bytes in a zebibyte, and bits in a zebibit.
- Computing – Manufacturing: Intel predicted that there would be 1.2×10^{21} transistors in the world by 2015 and Forbes estimated that 2.9×10^{21} transistors had been shipped up to 2014.
- Biology: The number of individual copepods, thought to be the most abundant animal on Earth, is approximately 1.3×10^{21}.
- Mathematics: 2^{71} = 2,361,183,241,434,822,606,848 is the largest known power of two not containing the digit 5 in its decimal representation. The same is true for the digit 7.
- Chemistry: There are about 5×10^{21} atoms in a drop of water.
- Mathematics – Sudoku: There are 6,670,903,752,021,072,936,960 (≈6.7×10^{21}) possible (unique) 9×9 Sudoku grids.

== 10^{22} ==
(10000000000000000000000; short scale: ten sextillion; long scale: ten thousand trillion, or ten trilliard)

- Computing: 10,000,000,000,000,000,000,000 (10^{22}) – number up to which all powers of 10 can be exactly represented in IEEE double-precision floating-point format.
- Mathematics: The smallest instance of exactly 20 prime numbers between multiples of 100 is 20,386,095,164,137,273,086,400 + n, for n = 1, 3, 7, 9, 13, 19, 21, 31, 33, 37, 49, 57, 63, 73, 79, 87, 91, 93, 97, 99.
- Mathematics: 5^{32} = 23,283,064,365,386,962,890,625 is the largest known power of five not containing a pair of consecutive equal digits.
- Mathematics: 24,153,319,581,254,312,065,344 is the sixth and largest known taxicab number.
- Astronomy – Stars: 70 sextillion = 7×10^{22}, the estimated number of stars within range of telescopes (as of 2003).

== 10^{23} ==
(100000000000000000000000; short scale: one hundred sextillion; long scale: one hundred thousand trillion, or one hundred trilliard)

- Astronomy – Stars: in the range of 10^{23} to 10^{24} stars in the observable universe.
- Mathematics: 146,361,946,186,458,562,560,000 (≈1.5×10^{23}) is the fifth and largest known unitary perfect number.
- Mathematics: 47# × 7# × 5 × 3^{3} × 2^{4} = 278,914,005,382,139,703,576,000 (≈2.7891×10^{23}) is the smallest positive integer to exceed a million divisors. It is the 213th highly composite number, and its number of divisors is 2^{14} × 3^{2} × 7 = 1,032,192.
- Mathematics: 2^{78} = 302,231,454,903,657,293,676,544 is the largest known power of two not containing the digit 8 in its decimal representation.
- Mathematics: 357,686,312,646,216,567,629,137 (≈3.6×10^{23}) is the largest left-truncatable prime.

Visualisation of a mole of 1 mm^{3} cubes arranged into a cube with 84.4 km (52.4 mi) sides, overlaid on maps of South East England and London (top), and Long Island and New York City (bottom)

- Chemistry – Physics: The Avogadro constant (6.02214076×10^{23}) is the number of constituents (e.g. atoms or molecules) in one mole of a substance, defined for convenience as expressing the order of magnitude separating the molecular from the macroscopic scale.

== 10^{24} ==
(1000000000000000000000000; 1000^{8}; short scale: one septillion; long scale: one quadrillion)

ISO: yotta- (Y)

- Computing: 1,208,925,819,614,629,174,706,176 – the number of bytes in a yobibyte, and bits in a yobibit.
- Mathematics: 2,833,419,889,721,787,128,217,599 (≈2.8×10^{24}) is the fifth Woodall prime.
- Mathematics: 3,608,528,850,368,400,786,036,725 (≈3.6×10^{24}) is the largest polydivisible number.
- Mathematics – Impossiball: There are 23,563,902,142,421,896,679,424,000 (about 2.36×10^{25}) different positions of the Impossiball.
- Mathematics: 2^{86} = 77,371,252,455,336,267,181,195,264 is the largest known power of two not containing the digit '0' in its decimal representation.
- Mathematics: 2^{89} − 1 = 618,970,019,642,690,137,449,562,111 (≈6.19×10^{26}) is the tenth Mersenne prime. See List of Mersenne primes and perfect numbers.

== 10^{27} ==
7×10^{27} atoms in the average human body

(1000000000000000000000000000; 1000^{9}; short scale: one octillion; long scale: one thousand quadrillion, or one quadrilliard)

ISO: ronna- (R)

- Computing: 1,237,940,039,285,380,274,899,124,224 – the number of bytes in a robibyte, and bits in a robibit.
- Mathematics: 2^{91} = 2,475,880,078,570,760,549,798,248,448 is the largest known power of two not containing the digit '1' in its decimal representation.
- Biology – Atoms in the human body: the average human body contains roughly 7×10^{27} atoms.
- Mathematics: 2^{93} = 9,903,520,314,283,042,199,192,993,792 is the largest known power of two not containing the digit '6' in its decimal representation.
- Mathematics – Poker: the number of unique combinations of hands and shared cards in a 10-player game of Texas hold 'em is approximately 2.117×10^{28}.

== 10^{30} ==
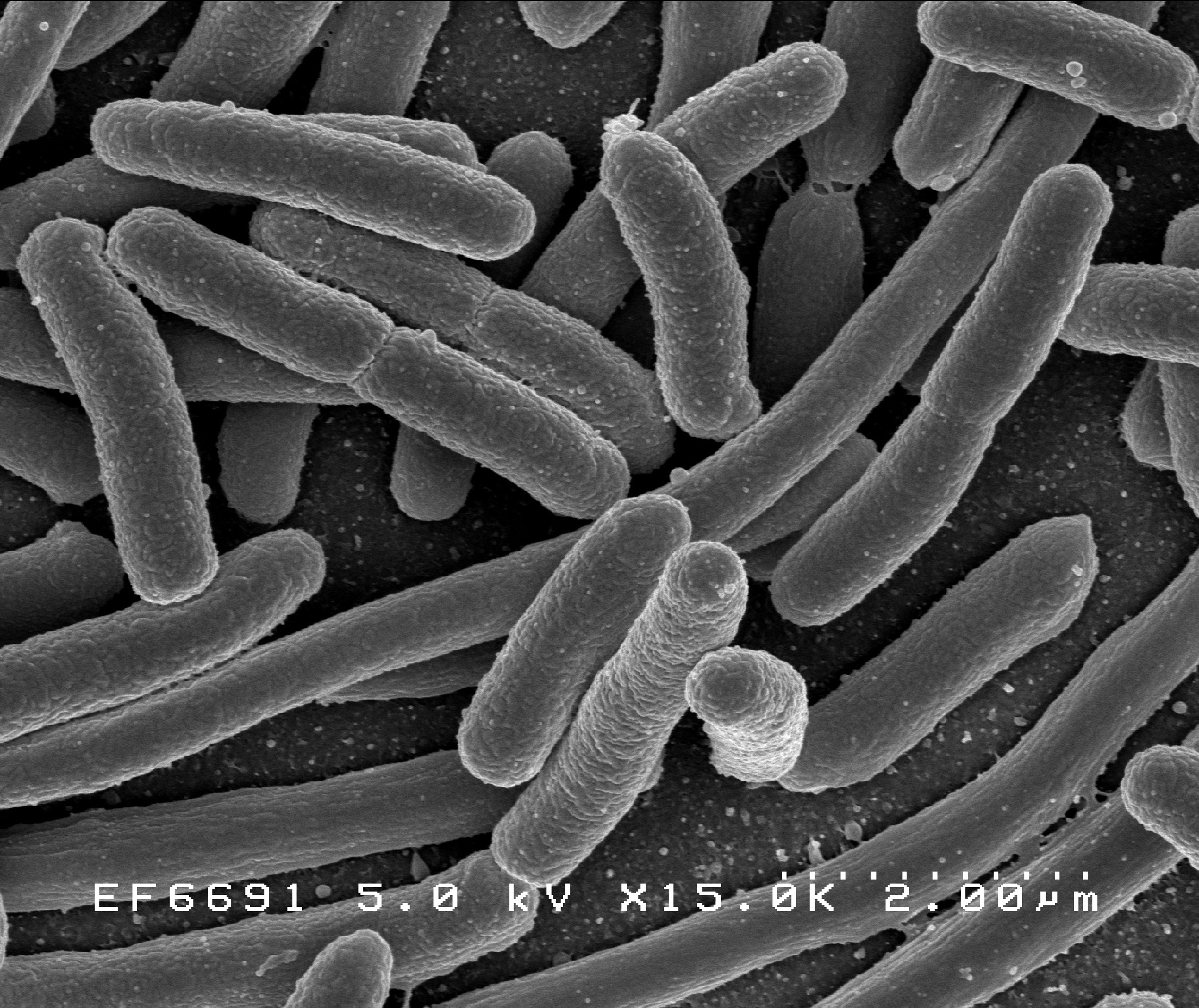
5 × 10^{30} bacterial cells on Earth

(1000000000000000000000000000000; 1000^{10}; short scale: one nonillion; long scale: one quintillion)

ISO: quetta- (Q)

- Mathematics: Belphegor's prime, 10^{30} + 666 × 10^{14} + 1, or 1,000,000,000,000,066,600,000,000,000,001.
- Computing: 1,267,650,600,228,229,401,496,703,205,376 – the number of bytes in a quebibyte, and bits in a quebibit.
- Biology – Bacterial cells on Earth: The number of bacterial cells on Earth is estimated at 5,000,000,000,000,000,000,000,000,000,000, or 5 × 10^{30}.
- Mathematics: The number of partitions of 1000 is 24,061,467,864,032,622,473,692,149,727,991.
- Mathematics: 2^{107} − 1 = 162,259,276,829,213,363,391,578,010,288,127 (≈1.62×10^{32}) is the 11th Mersenne prime.
- Mathematics: 2^{107} = 162,259,276,829,213,363,391,578,010,288,128 is the largest known power of two not containing the digit '4' in its decimal representation.
- Mathematics: 3^{68} = 278,128,389,443,693,511,257,285,776,231,761 is the largest known power of three not containing the digit '0' in its decimal representation.
- Mathematics: 2^{108} = 324,518,553,658,426,726,783,156,020,576,256 is the largest known power of two not containing the digit '9' in its decimal representation.

== 10^{33} ==
(1000000000000000000000000000000000; 1000^{11}; short scale: one decillion; long scale: one thousand quintillion, or one quintilliard)

- Mathematics: 10^{33} = 1,000,000,000,000,000,000,000,000,000,000,000 is the largest known power of 10 that can be expressed as the product of two numbers (2^{33} = 8,589,934,592 and 5^{33} = 116,415,321,826,934,814,453,125) that each have no zero digits.
- Computing: 10,384,593,717,069,655,257,060,992,658,440,192 (2^{113}) – number until which all integer values can exactly be represented in IEEE quadruple-precision floating-point format.
- Mathematics – Alexander's Star: There are 72,431,714,252,715,638,411,621,302,272,000,000 (about 7.24×10^{34}) different positions of Alexander's Star.

== 10^{36} ==
(1000000000000000000000000000000000000; 1000^{12}; short scale: one undecillion; long scale: one sextillion)

- Mathematics: 2,658,455,991,569,831,744,654,692,615,953,842,176 (≈2.66×10^{36}) is the ninth perfect number.
- Biology: The total number of DNA base pairs on Earth is estimated at 5.0×10^{37}.
- Mathematics: 2^{126} = 85,070,591,730,234,615,865,843,651,857,942,052,864 is the largest known power of two not containing a pair of consecutive equal digits.
- Mathematics: 2^{2^{7}−1} − 1 = 170,141,183,460,469,231,731,687,303,715,884,105,727 (≈1.7×10^{38}) is the largest known double Mersenne prime and the 12th Mersenne prime.
- Computing: 34! (roughly 2.952328×10^{38}), is the largest factorial value that can be represented in the IEEE single-precision floating-point format.
- Computing: 2^{128} × (1 - 2^{−22}) ≈ 3.402823×10^{38} is the largest representable positive real number in single-precision floating-point format
- Computing: 2^{128} = 340,282,366,920,938,463,463,374,607,431,768,211,456 (≈3.40282367×10^{38}), the theoretical maximum number of Internet addresses that can be allocated under the IPv6 addressing system, the total number of different Universally Unique Identifiers (UUIDs) that can be generated, and the total number of different possible keys in the AES 128-bit key space (symmetric cipher).

== 10^{39} ==
(1000000000000000000000000000000000000000; 1000^{13}; short scale: one duodecillion; long scale: one thousand sextillion, or one sextilliard)

- Cosmology: The Eddington–Dirac number is roughly 10^{40}.
- Mathematics: 5^{58} = 34,694,469,519,536,141,888,238,489,627,838,134,765,625 is the largest known power of five not containing the digit '0' in its decimal representation.
- Mathematics: 97# × 2^{5} × 3^{3} × 5 × 7 = 69,720,375,229,712,477,164,533,808,935,312,303,556,800 (≈6.97×10^{40}) is the least common multiple of every integer from 1 to 100.

== 10^{42} ==
(1000000000000000000000000000000000000000000; 1000^{14}; short scale: one tredecillion; long scale: one septillion)

- Mathematics: $\mathsf{\tfrac{2^{148}+1}{17}}$ = 20,988,936,657,440,586,486,151,264,256,610,222,593,863,921 (≈2.09889367×10^{43}) is the largest record prime not found by a computer.
- Mathematics: 141 × 2^{141} + 1 = 393,050,634,124,102,232,869,567,034,555,427,371,542,904,833 (≈3.93×10^{44}) is the second Cullen prime.

== 10^{45} ==
(1000000000000000000000000000000000000000000000; 1000^{15}; short scale: one quattuordecillion; long scale: one thousand septillion, or one septilliard)

- Mathematics: 5^{65} = 2,710,505,431,213,761,085,018,632,002,174,854,278,564,453,125 is the largest known power of five which is not pandigital: There is no digit '9' in its decimal representation.
- Mathematics: There are 7,401,196,841,564,901,869,874,093,974,498,574,336,000,000,000 (≈7.4×10^{45}) possible permutations for the Rubik's Revenge (4×4×4 Rubik's Cube).
- Mathematics: 2^{153} = 11,417,981,541,647,679,048,466,287,755,595,961,091,061,972,992 is the largest known power of two not containing the digit '3' in its decimal representation.

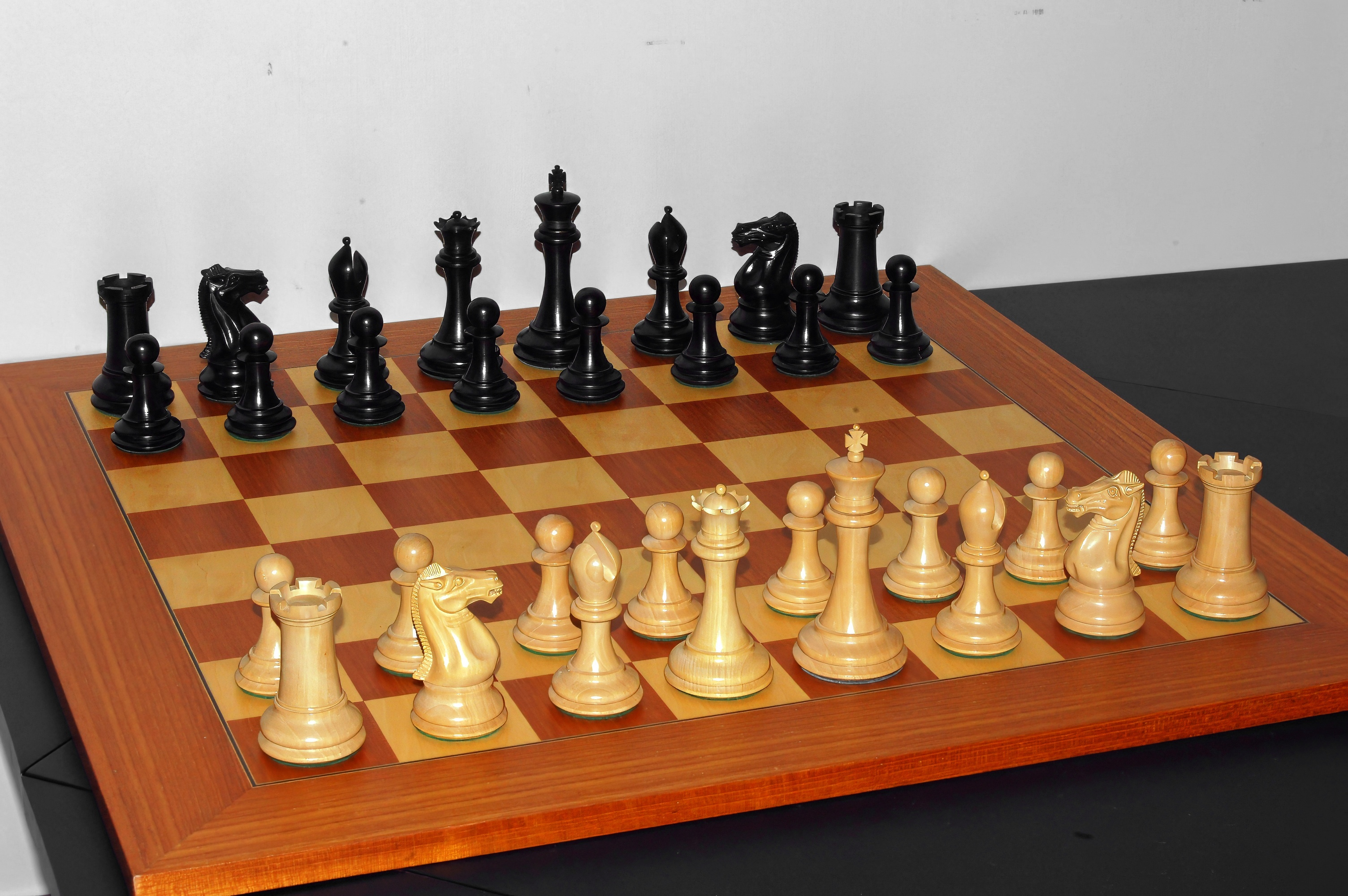
4.52×10^{46} legal chess positions

- Chess: 4.52×10^{46} is a proven upper bound for the number of chess positions allowed according to the rules of chess.
- Mathematics: 2^{157} = 182,687,704,666,362,864,775,460,604,089,535,377,456,991,567,872 is the smallest apocalyptic number.

== 10^{48} ==
(1000000000000000000000000000000000000000000000000; 1000^{16}; short scale: one quindecillion; long scale: one octillion)

- Computing: 10^{48} – number up to which all powers of 10 can be exactly represented in IEEE quadruple-precision floating-point format.
- Geo: 1.33×10^{50} is the estimated number of atoms on Earth.
- Mathematics: 2^{168} = 374,144,419,156,711,147,060,143,317,175,368,453,031,918,731,001,856 is the largest known power of two which is not pandigital: There is no digit '2' in its decimal representation.
- Mathematics: 3^{106} = 375,710,212,613,636,260,325,580,163,599,137,907,799,836,383,538,729 is the largest known power of three which is not pandigital: There is no digit '4' in its decimal representation.

== 10^{51} ==
(1000000000000000000000000000000000000000000000000; 1000^{17}; short scale: one sexdecillion; long scale: one thousand octillion, or one octilliard)

- Mathematics: 7^{61} = 3,556,153,025,177,363,557,255,317,383,565,515,512,407,041,673,852,007 is the largest known power of seven which is not pandigital: There is no digit '9' in its decimal representation.
- Mathematics: 191,561,942,608,236,107,294,793,378,084,303,638,130,997,321,548,169,216 (≈1.92×10^{53}) is the tenth perfect number. It is also the first perfect number to contain all decimal digits.
- Mathematics: 808,017,424,794,512,875,886,459,904,961,710,757,005,754,368,000,000,000 (≈8.08×10^{53}) is the order of the monster group.

== 10^{54} to 10^{63} ==
(1000000000000000000000000000000000000000000000000000; 1000^{18}; short scale: one septendecillion; long scale: one nonillion)

- Mathematics: Starting at 1024^{18} = 1,532,495,540,865,888,858,358,347,027,150,309,183,618,739,122,183,602,176 (≈1.53249554×10^{54}), the deviation for the nth power of 2^{10} from 1000^{n} is over 50%.
- Cryptography: 2^{192} = 6,277,101,735,386,680,763,835,789,423,207,666,416,102,355,444,464,034,512,896 (6.27710174×10^{57}), the total number of different possible keys in the Advanced Encryption Standard (AES) 192-bit key space (symmetric cipher).
- Scale: 10^{60} – the scale factor between the largest metric prefix, quetta (10^{30}), and the smallest metric prefix, quecto (10^{−30}).
- Cosmology: 8×10^{60} is roughly the number of Planck time intervals since the universe is theorised to have been created in the Big Bang 13.799 ± 0.021 billion years ago.

== 10^{63} to 10^{80} ==
(1000000000000000000000000000000000000000000000000000000000000000; 1000^{21}; short scale: one vigintillion; long scale: one thousand decillion, or one decilliard)

- Cosmology: 1×10^{63} is Archimedes' estimate in The Sand Reckoner of the total number of grains of sand that could fit into the entire cosmos, the diameter of which he estimated in stadia to be what we call 2 light-years.
- Mathematics: 3^{133} = 2,865,014,852,390,475,710,679,572,105,323,242,035,759,805,416,923,029,389,510,561,523 is the largest known power of three not containing a pair of consecutive equal digits.
- Mathematics – Cards: 52! = 80,658,175,170,943,878,571,660,636,856,403,766,975,289,505,440,883,277,824,000,000,000,000 (≈8.07×10^{67}) – the number of ways to order the cards in a 52-card deck.
- Mathematics: There are 100,669,616,553,523,347,122,516,032,313,645,505,168,688,116,411,019,768,627,200,000,000,000 (≈1.01×10^{68}) possible combinations for the Megaminx.
- Mathematics: 2^{229} = 862,718,293,348,820,473,429,344,482,784,628,181,556,388,621,521,298,319,395,315,527,974,912 (≈8.63×10^{68}) is the largest known power of two containing the least number of zeros relative to its power. It is conjectured by Metin Sariyar that every digit 0 to 9 is inclined to appear an equal number of times in the decimal expansion of power of two as the power increases.
- Computing: 2^{237} = 220,855,883,097,298,041,197,912,187,592,864,814,478,435,487,109,452,369,765,200,775,161,577,472 (≈2.21×10^{71}) – number until which all integer values can exactly be represented in IEEE octuple precision floating-point format.
- Mathematics: 1,808,422,353,177,349,564,546,512,035,512,530,001,279,481,259,854,248,860,454,348,989,451,026,887 (≈1.81×10^{72}) – The largest known prime factor found by Lenstra elliptic-curve factorization (LECF) as of 2010.
- Mathematics: There are 282,870,942,277,741,856,536,180,333,107,150,328,293,127,731,985,672,134,721,536,000,000,000,000,000 (≈2.83×10^{74}) possible permutations for the Professor's Cube (5×5×5 Rubik's Cube).
- Cryptography: 2^{256} = 115,792,089,237,316,195,423,570,985,008,687,907,853,269,984,665,640,564,039,457,584,007,913,129,639,936 (≈1.15792089×10^{77}), the total number of different possible keys in the Advanced Encryption Standard (AES) 256-bit key space (symmetric cipher).
- Mathematics: 180 × (M_{127})^{2} + 1 (roughly 5.21064402×10^{78}) is the first record-breaking prime found by an electronic computer.

== 10^{80} to 10^{100} ==
(100000000000000000000000000000000000000000000000000000000000000000000000000000000; short scale: one hundred quinvigintillion; long scale: one hundred tredecillion)

- Cosmology: Various sources estimate the total number of fundamental particles in the observable universe to be within the range of 10^{80} to 10^{85}. However, these estimates are generally regarded as guesswork. (Compare the Eddington number, the estimated total number of protons in the observable universe.)
- Mathematics: Starting at 1024^{30} = 2,037,035,976,334,486,086,268,445,688,409,378,161,051,468,393,665,936,250,636,140,449,354,381,299,763,336,706,183,397,376 (≈2.03703598×10^{90}), the deviation for the nth power of 2^{10} from 1000^{n} is over 100%.
- Mathematics: 7,228,828,176,786,792,552,781,668,926,755,667,258,635,743,361,825,711,373,791,931,117,197,999,133,917,737,137,399,993,737,111,177 (≈7.22882818×10^{96}) is the largest left-and-right-truncatable prime with an odd number of digits.
- Computing: 9.999999×10^{96} is equal to the largest value that can be represented in the IEEE decimal32 floating-point format.
- Computing: 69! (roughly 1.7112245×10^{98}), is the largest factorial value that can be represented on a calculator with two digits for powers of ten without overflow.
- Computing: 2^{332} = 8,749,002,899,132,047,697,490,008,908,470,485,461,412,677,723,572,849,745,703,082,425,639,811,996,797,503,692,894,052,708,092,215,296 (≈8.7490029×10^{99}) is the largest power of two that can be represented on a calculator with two digits for powers of ten without overflow.
- Mathematics: One googol, 1×10^{100}, 1 followed by one hundred zeros, or 10,000,000,000,000,000,000,000,000,000,000,000,000,000,000,000,000,000,000,000,000,000,000,000,000,000,000,000,000,000,000,000,000,000.

== 10^{100} (one googol) to 10^{153} ==
(10000000000000000000000000000000000000000000000000000000000000000000000000000000000000000000000000000; short scale: ten duotrigintillion; long scale: ten thousand sexdecillion, or ten sexdecillard)

- Computing: 10^{102} – number up to which all powers of 10 can be exactly represented in IEEE octuple-precision floating-point format.
- Mathematics: 91 617 596 742 869 619 884 432 721 391 145 374 777 686 825 634 291 523 771 171 391 111 313 737 919 133 977 331 737 137 933 773 713 713 973 (≈9.16759674×10^{103}) is the largest left-and-right-truncatable prime with an even number of digits.
- Mathematics: The first instance of two consecutive 4's in Gijswijt's sequence begins at index 255 895 648 634 818 208 370 064 452 304 769 558 261 700 170 817 472 823 398 081 655 524 438 021 806 620 809 813 295 008 281 436 789 493 636 144 ≈ 2.5590×10^{107}.
- Mathematics: There are $\frac{8! \times 3^7 \times 24!^6}{24^{25}}$ ≃ 1.5715×10^{116} distinguishable permutations of the V-Cube 6 (6×6×6 Rubik's Cube).
- Chess: Shannon number, 10^{120}, a lower bound of the game-tree complexity of chess.
- Physics: 10^{120}, discrepancy between the observed value of the cosmological constant and a naive estimate based on Quantum Field Theory and the Planck energy.
- Physics: 5.9×10^{121}, ratio of the mass-energy in the observable universe to the energy of a photon with a wavelength the size of the observable universe.
- History – Religion: Asaṃkhyeya is a Buddhist name for the number 10^{140}. It is listed in the Avatamsaka Sutra and metaphorically means "innumerable" in the Sanskrit language of ancient India.
- Xiangqi: 10^{150}, an estimation of the game-tree complexity of xiangqi.

== 10^{153} to 10^{303} ==
(10^{153}; short scale: one quinquagintillion; long scale: one thousand quinvigintillion, or one quinvigintilliard)

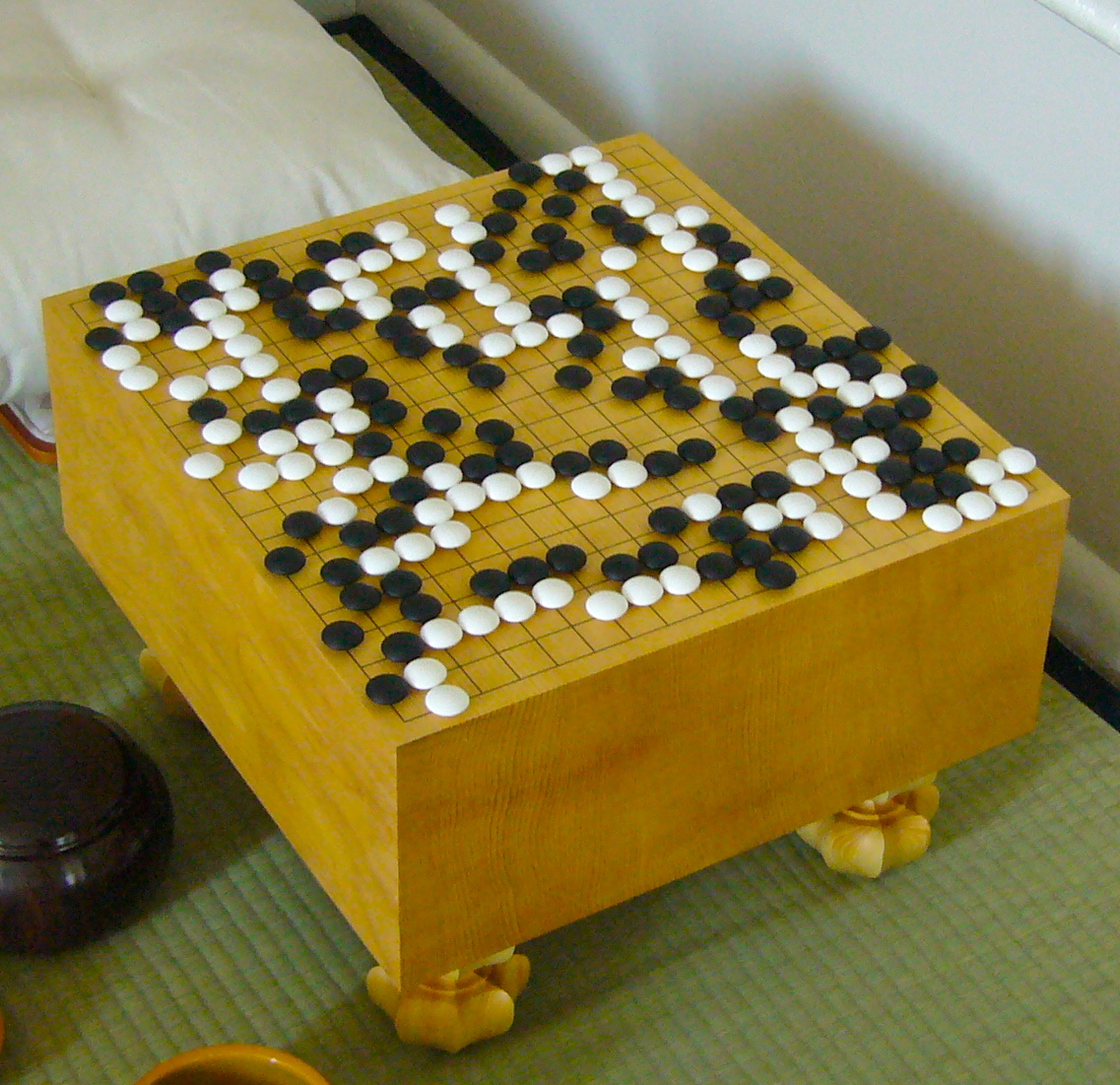
≈2.08×10^{170} legal Go positions

- Mathematics: 347# × 23# × 11 × 7 × 5^{2} × 3^{4} × 2^{8} ≈ 6.6737×10^{153} is the largest number that is both superabundant and highly composite.
- Mathematics: 2^{521} − 1 ≈ 6.8648×10^{156} is the largest known prime that is both a Mersenne prime and Woodall prime.
- Mathematics: There are $\frac{8! \times 3^7 \times 12! \times 2^{10} \times 24!^8}{24^{36}}$ ≈ 1.9501×10^{160} distinguishable permutations of the V-Cube 7 (7×7×7 Rubik's Cube).
- Go: There are 208 168 199 381 979 984 699 478 633 344 862 770 286 522 453 884 530 548 425 639 456 820 927 419 612 738 015 378 525 648 451 698 519 643 907 259 916 015 628 128 546 089 888 314 427 129 715 319 317 557 736 620 397 247 064 840 935 (≈2.08×10^{170}) legal positions in the game of Go.
- Economics: The annualized rate of the hyperinflation in Hungary in 1946 was estimated to be 2.9×10^{177}%. It was the most extreme case of hyperinflation ever recorded.
- Board games: 3.457×10^{181}, number of ways to arrange the tiles in English Scrabble on a standard 15-by-15 Scrabble board.
- Physics: 8×10^{184}, approximate number of Planck volumes in the observable universe.
- Mathematics: There are $\frac{60!^2 \times 30! \times 2^{29}}{8}$ ≈ 1.2325×10^{204} distinguishable permutations of the Tuttminx.
- Mathematics: There are $\frac{8! \times 3^7 \times 24!^{12}}{24^{55}}$ ≈ 3.5174×10^{217} distinguishable permutations of the V-Cube 8 (8×8×8 Rubik's Cube).
- Shogi: 10^{226}, an estimation of the game-tree complexity of shogi.
- Physics: 7×10^{245}, approximate spacetime volume of the history of the observable universe in Planck units.
- Mathematics: 2^{975} ≈ 3.1933445×10^{293} is the first power of two to contain all two-digit strings.

== 10^{303} to 10^{1000} ==
(10^{303}; short scale: one centillion; long scale: one thousand quinquagintillion, or one quinquagintilliard)

- Computing: 170! (roughly 7.2574156×10^{306}), is the largest factorial value that can be represented in the IEEE double-precision floating-point format.
- Computing: 2^{1024} × (1 - 2^{−53}) ≈ 1.797693134862316×10^{308} is the largest value that can be represented in the IEEE double-precision floating-point format.
- Mathematics: 1.397162914×10^{316} is an estimate of a value of $x$ for which $\operatorname{li}(x) < \pi(x)$ (known as Skewes's number) given by Stoll & Demichel (2011). A proved upper bound of exp(727.951346802) < 1.397182091×10^{316} (without assuming the Riemann hypothesis) or exp(727.951338612) < 1.397170648×10^{316} (assuming RH) is given by Zegowitz (2010).
- Computing: (10 – 10^{−15})×10^{384} is equal to the largest value that can be represented in the IEEE decimal64 floating-point format.
- Mathematics: 997# × 31# × 7 × 5^{2} × 3^{4} × 2^{7} ≈ 7.1289×10^{432} is the least common multiple of every integer from 1 to 1000.
- Physics: The number of distinct compactified vacua in type IIB string theory is estimated at 10^{500}.
- Mathematics: 2^{2000} ≈ 1.1481307×10^{602} is the largest known power of two not containing the string '10' in its decimal representation.
- Mathematics: 2063# × 73# × 23# × 11 × 7^{2} × 5^{3} × 3^{7} × 2^{12} ≈ 4.5794×10^{917} is the smallest positive integer to exceed a googol divisors. It is the 24,067th highly composite number, and its number of divisors is 2^{303} × 3^{13} × 5 × 7 × 11 ≈ 1.0002×10^{100}.
- Computing: 449! (roughly 3.8519305×10^{997}), is the largest factorial value that can be represented on a calculator with three digits for powers of ten without overflow.

== 10^{1000} to 10^{10,000} ==
- Mathematics: 2^{3499} ≈ 2.01351481×10^{1053} is the largest known power of two that doesn't contain all of the two-digit strings: There is no string '95' in its decimal representation.
- Mathematics: The number of partitions of 1 million is about 1.47×10^{1107}.
- Mathematics: 4713 × 2^{4713} + 1 ≈ 2.68×10^{1422} is the third Cullen prime.
- Mathematics: There are approximately 1.869×10^{4099} distinguishable permutations of the world's largest Rubik's Cube (33×33×33).
- Computing: 2^{16384} × (1 − 2^{−64}) ≈ 1.18973149535723176505×10^{4932} is the largest value that can be represented in the IEEE 80-bit x86 extended precision floating-point format.
- Computing: 2^{16384} × (1 − 2^{−113}) ≈ 1.1897314953572317650857593266280070×10^{4932} is the largest value that can be represented in the IEEE quadruple-precision floating-point format.
- Mathematics: 2^{16,963} ≈ 2.35405415×10^{5106} is the first power of two to contain all three-digit strings.
- Computing: (10 – 10^{−33})×10^{6144} is the largest value that can be represented in the IEEE decimal128 floating-point format.
- Computing: 10^{10,000} − 1 is equal to the largest value that can be represented in Windows Phone's calculator.

== 10^{10,000} to 10^{100,000} ==
- Mathematics: 2^{53,992} ≈ 1.62751833×10^{16253} is the largest known power of two that doesn't contain all of the three-digit strings: There is no string '661' in its decimal representation.
- Mathematics: $2\uparrow\uparrow5$ is approximately 2.00353×10^{19728}.
- Mathematics: 57,612,705,200,181 × 2^{69,801} - 1 is one of the primes of a 21,026-digit prime triplet; the largest known as of January 2026.
- Mathematics: F_{201107} is a 42,029-digit Fibonacci prime; the largest known certain Fibonacci prime as of September 2023.
- Mathematics: L_{202667} is a 42,355-digit Lucas prime; the largest confirmed Lucas prime as of November 2023.
- Mathematics: 2^{239,697} ≈ 9.70220997×10^{72155} is the first power of two to contain all four-digit strings.
- Computing: 10^{75257} is equal to the largest power of ten that can be represented in Android's Google calculator.
- Computing: 2^{250,000} is equal to the largest odd power of two that can be represented in Android Google's calculator.
- Computing: 2^{262144} × (1 − 2^{−237}) ≈ 1.61132571748576047361957211845200501064402387454966951747637125049607183×10^{78913} is the largest value that can be represented in the IEEE octuple-precision floating-point format.

== 10^{100,000} to 10^{1,000,000} ==
- Mathematics: (10^{109297} − 1)/9, with 109,297 digits, is the largest proven repunit prime in base 10 as of May 2025.
- Mathematics: 5^{262,144} ≈ 6.206069879×10^{183230} is the fifth exponential factorial. The next exponential factorial is approximately 4.83×10^{183230} digits long.
- Mathematics: 2^{653,060} ≈ 4.4562374×10^{196590} is the largest known power of two that doesn't contain all of the four-digit strings: There is no string '6164' in its decimal representation.
- Mathematics: approximately 7.76 × 10^{206,544} cattle in the smallest herd which satisfies the conditions of Archimedes's cattle problem.
- Physics: The number of distinct compactified vacua in the string theory landscape is estimated in F-theory at around 10^{272,000}.
- Mathematics: 2,618,163,402,417 × 2^{1,290,000} − 1 is a 388,342-digit Sophie Germain prime; the largest known as of April 2023.
- Mathematics: 2,996,863,034,895 × 2^{1,290,000} ± 1 are 388,342-digit twin primes; the largest known as of April 2023.

== 10^{1,000,000} to 10^{10^{9}} ==
Digit growth in the largest known prime

- Mathematics: L_{5466311} is a 1,142,392-digit Lucas probable prime; the largest known as of August 2022.
- Mathematics – Literature: Jorge Luis Borges' Library of Babel contains at least 25^{1,312,000} ≈ 1.956 × 10^{1,834,097} books (this is a lower bound).
- Mathematics: 4 × 72^{1,119,849} − 1 is the smallest prime of the form 4 × 72^{n} − 1.
- Mathematics: 2^{6,972,593} − 1 is a 2,098,960-digit Mersenne prime; the 38th Mersenne prime and the last Mersenne prime discovered in the 20th century.
- Mathematics: F_{10367321} is a 2,166,642-digit probable Fibonacci prime; the largest known as of July 2024.
- Mathematics: 10^{2,718,281} − 5 × 10^{1,631,138} – 5 × 10^{1,087,142} − 1 is a 2,718,281-digit palindromic prime, the largest known as of September 2025.
- Mathematics: 632,760! - 1 is a 3,395,992-digit factorial prime; the largest known as of September 2025.
- Mathematics: 9,562,633# + 1 is a 4,151,498-digit primorial prime; the largest known as of September 2025.
- Mathematics: (2^{15,135,397} + 1)/3 is a 4,556,209-digit Wagstaff probable prime, the largest known as of June 2021.
- Mathematics: 81 × 2^{20,498,148} + 1 is a 6,170,560-digit Pierpont prime, the largest known as of 2023.
- Mathematics: (10^{8,177,207} − 1)/9 is an 8,177,207-digit probable prime, the largest known as of 8 May 2021.
- Mathematics: 2524190^{2097152} + 1 is an 13,426,224-digit generalized Fermat prime, and the largest known non-Mersenne prime as of October 2025.
- Mathematics: 2^{136,279,841} − 1 is a 41,024,320-digit Mersenne prime; the largest known prime of any kind as of 2025.
- Mathematics: 2^{136,279,840} × (2^{136,279,841} − 1) is an 82,048,640-digit perfect number, the largest known as of 2025.
- Mathematics: G(4) = 3 × 2^{(3 × 2^{27} + 27)} − 2 ≈ 6.895081×10^{121210694} is the length of the Goodstein sequence beginning with 4. Its first and last 20 digits are 68950808030926201657...23844928197722374142.
- Mathematics: 9^{9^{9}} ≈ 4.281248×10^{369693099} is the largest number that can be written with just three digits.

== 10^{10^{9}} to 10^{10^{100}} (one googolplex) ==
- Mathematics: If any further solutions to the Erdős–Moser equation exist, m must be greater than 10^{10^{9}}.
- Mathematics: The first non-integer value in Göbel's sequence is approximately 5.4093×10^{178485291567}.
- Mathematics – History: 10^{8×10^{16}}, largest named number in Archimedes' Sand Reckoner.
- Mathematics: 2^{2^{61}} − 1 ≈ 1.695×10^{694127911065419641} is the smallest candidate for the next double Mersenne prime. However, it has no prime factor below 1 × 10^{36}.
- Biology – Life experiences: There are an estimated 10^{10^{18}} possible life experiences.
- Mathematics: The first instance of a 5 in Gijswijt's sequence occurs near index 3.2719044223289929745×10^{125857689874791897769333} ≈ 10^{1.258577×10^{23}}.
- Mathematics: SSCG(2) = 3 × 2^{(3 × 2^{95})} − 8 ≈ 3.241704×10^{35775080127201286522908640065} ≈ 10^{3.577508×10^{28}}. Its first and last 20 digits are 32417042291246009846...34057047399148290040.
- Mathematics: 2^{2^{127}} − 1 ≈ 5.45431×10^{51217599719369681875006054625051616349} is the 6th term of the Catalan–Mersenne number sequence and the smallest one whose primality is unknown. No known methods can prove that this and any further terms are prime.
- Mathematics: 10^{googol} ($10^{10^{100}}$), a googolplex. A number 1 followed by 1 googol zeros. Carl Sagan has estimated that 1 googolplex, fully written out, would not fit in the observable universe because of its size.

== 10^{10^{100}} to 10^{10^{10^{34}}} ==
(One googolplex; 10^{googol}; short scale and long scale: googolplex)

- Go: There are at least 10^{10^{108}} legal games of Go.
- Go: There are at most 10^{10^{171}} legal games of Go.
- Mathematics: The Leviathan number, defined by Pickover in 1995, is equal to (10^{666})!, and is also approximately 10^{6.65565706×10^{668}}. Its first six digits are 134072.
- Mathematics: 6^{5^{262,144}} ≈ 10^{4.829261036×10^{183230}} is the sixth exponential factorial.
- Mathematics – Literature: The number of different ways in which the books in Jorge Luis Borges' Library of Babel can be arranged is approximately $10^{10^{1\,834\,102}}$, the factorial of the number of books in the Library of Babel.
- Mathematics: F_{18233954} = $2^{2^{18\,233\,954}} + 1 \approx 10^{3.733937 \times 10^{5\,488\,966}}$ is the largest known composite Fermat number as of 2025.
- Cosmology: In chaotic inflation theory, proposed by physicist Andrei Linde, our universe is one of many other universes with different physical constants that originated as part of our local section of the multiverse, owing to a vacuum that had not decayed to its ground state. According to Linde and Vanchurin, the total number of these universes is about $10^{10^{10\,000\,000}}$.

== 10^{10^{10^{34}}} to 10↑↑100 ==
- Mathematics: $10^{\,\!10^{10^{34}}}$, order of magnitude of an upper bound that occurred in a proof of Skewes (this was later estimated to be closer to 1.397 × 10^{316}).
- Mathematics: $2^{2^{1729^{12}}} \approx 10^{10^{10^{38.332150}}}$ is the smallest factor for which the multiplication algorithm of Harvey and van der Hoeven (2019) is faster than the Schönhage–Strassen algorithm.
- Cosmology: The estimated number of Planck time units for quantum fluctuations and tunnelling to generate a new Big Bang is estimated to be $10^{10^{10^{56}}}$.
- Mathematics: $10^{\,\!10^{10^{100}}}$, a number in the googol family called a googolplexplex, googolplexian, or googolduplex. 1 followed by a googolplex zeros, or 10^{googolplex}
- Cosmology: The uppermost estimate of the size of the entire universe is approximately $10^{10^{10^{122}}}$ times that of the observable universe.
- Mathematics: $10^{\,\!10^{10^{963}}}$, order of magnitude of another upper bound in a proof of Skewes.
- Mathematics: $10^{\,\!10^{10^{10^{100}}}}$, a googoltriplex, googolplexianth, or googolplexplexplex, one followed by googolplexplex zeroes.
- Mathematics: ${10 \uparrow \uparrow 100}$, a number called giggol, which is 10 tetrated to 100. It was coined by modifying the vowel sound of "googol".

== Larger than 10↑↑100 ==
- Mathematics: Steinhaus' mega lies between $10\uparrow\uparrow257$ and $10\uparrow\uparrow258$.
- Mathematics: g_{1} = $3\uparrow\uparrow\uparrow\uparrow 3$, called a grahal. See Graham's number.
- Mathematics: Steinhaus' megiston is equivalent to "10 in a circle". It lies between $10\uparrow\uparrow\uparrow11$ and $10\uparrow\uparrow\uparrow12$.
- Mathematics: Moser's number, "2 in a mega-gon" in Steinhaus–Moser notation, is approximately equal to $10 \uparrow^{10 \uparrow\uparrow 257} 10$; its last four digits are ...1056.
- Mathematics: Graham's number, defined as g_{64} where g_{1} is as above and g_{n} = $3 \uparrow^{g_{n-1}} 3$. The last ten digits are ...2464195387, and it arises as an upper bound solution to a problem in Ramsey theory.
- Mathematics: TREE(3): appears in relation to a theorem on trees in graph theory. Representation of the number is difficult, but one weak lower bound is A^{A(187196)}(1), where A(n) is a version of the Ackermann function.
- Mathematics: SSCG(3): appears in relation to the Robertson–Seymour theorem. Known to be greater than TREE(3).
- Mathematics: Transcendental integer: a set of numbers defined in 2000 by Harvey Friedman, appears in proof theory.
- Mathematics: Rayo's number is a large number named after Agustín Rayo which has been claimed to be the largest number to have ever been named. It was originally defined in a "big number duel" at MIT on 26 January 2007.

== See also ==
- Conway chained arrow notation
- Fast-growing hierarchy
- Indian numbering system
- Infinity
- Large numbers
- List of numbers
- Mathematical constant
- Names of large numbers
- Names of small numbers
- Power of 10
- Order of magnitude
