= Hundredth =

One piece out of 100

In arithmetic, a hundredth is a single part of something that has been divided equally into a hundred parts. For example, a hundredth of 675 is 6.75. In this manner it is used with the prefix "centi-" such as in centimeter. A hundredth is also one percent.

A hundredth is the reciprocal of 100.

A hundredth is written as a decimal fraction as 0.01, and as a vulgar fraction as 1/100.

“Hundredth” is also the ordinal number that follows “ninety-ninth” and precedes “hundred and first.” It is written as 100th.

== See also ==
- Basis point
- Cent (currency)
- Cent (music)
- Hundredth is an American rock band from Myrtle Beach, South Carolina, that formed in 2008.
- Order of magnitude (numbers)
- Orders of magnitude
- Percentage
- Point (gemstone)

| Preceded by Tenth | Decimal orders of magnitude | Succeeded by Thousandth |
