= Millionth =

1 part in a million, or reciprocal of a million

One millionth is equal to 0.000 001, or 1 × 10^{−6} in scientific notation. It is the reciprocal of a million, and can be also written as 1/1,000,000. Units using this fraction can be indicated using the prefix "micro-" from Greek, meaning "small". Numbers of this quantity are expressed in terms of μ (the Greek letter mu).

"Millionth" can also mean the ordinal number that comes after the nine hundred, ninety-nine thousand, nine hundred, ninety-ninth and before the million and first.

== See also ==
- International System of Units
- Micro-
- International Map of the World
- Order of magnitude (numbers)
- Order of magnitude
- Parts-per notation
- Per mille

Preceded by Thousandth	Decimal orders of magnitude	Succeeded by Billionth
