= Nine-Colour Cube =

Cubic combination puzzle

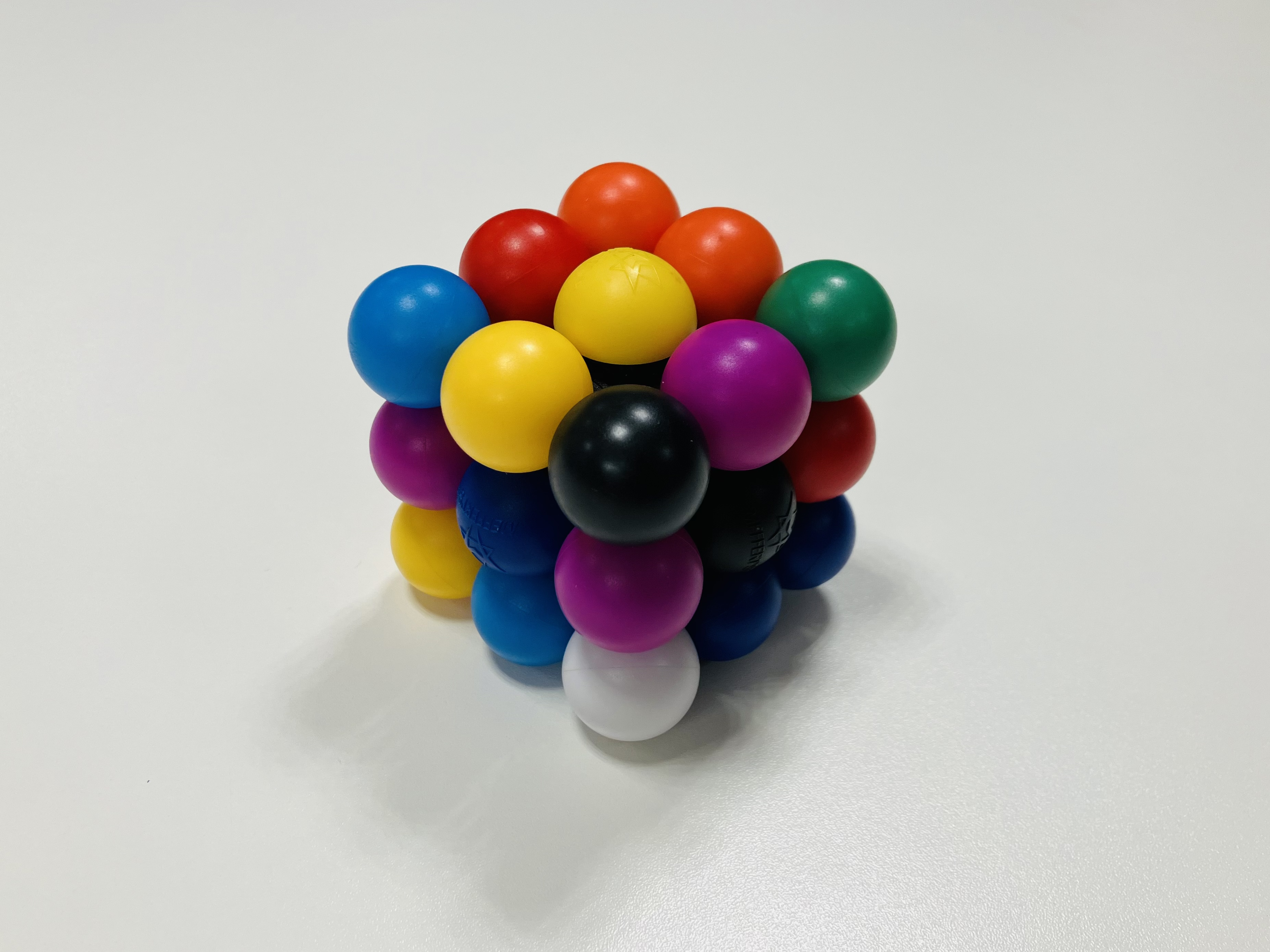
Meffert's Molecube, scrambled

The Nine-Colour Cube (see below for other names) is a cubic twisty puzzle. It was invented in 2005 by Milan Vodicka and mass-produced by Meffert's seven years later. Mechanically, the puzzle is identical to the Rubik's Cube; however, unlike the 3×3×3 Rubik's Cube, which only has 6 different colours, the Nine-Colour Cube has 9 colours, with the individual pieces having one colour each.

== Name ==
The puzzle is known under several different names. Milan Vodicka, the inventor, initially gave it the name "Nine-Colour Scramble Cube", which reflected the key feature and the de facto objective of the puzzle. This name was later shortened by some to Nine-Colour Cube. When Meffert's started mass-producing the puzzle, the company changed the shape of the cubies into spheres and thus adopted the name Ball Sudoku Cube (since the aim of the puzzle is similar to that of the Sudoku Cube). However, when Recent Toys started selling the puzzle with Meffert's branding, they named it Molecube (pronounced /ˈmɒləkjuːb/), presumably due to its resemblance to a molecular model. The Twisty Puzzles Museum already uses the term "Molecube" to refer to another, mechanically different twisty puzzle. In late 2016, Meffert's introduced a stickerless, cubic (albeit pillowed) version of the puzzle and called it the Kokonotsu Pillow.

== Overview ==
Just like a regular Rubik's Cube, the Nine-Colour Cube consists of 6 face centre pieces, 12 edge pieces and 8 corner pieces; each twist rotates one face centre piece and moves the four edge and four corner pieces that surround it. However, the difference between the two puzzles is their purpose: on a standard Rubik's Cube, the aim is to arrange the puzzle in such a way that every face has only one colour; on the Nine-Colour Cube, the goal is opposite: to arrange it so that every face contains all nine colours exactly once.

The Sudoku Cube is similar to the Nine-Colour Cube in that the objective of the Sudoku Cube is to arrange it such that each face contains each number (1 to 9) exactly once.

=== Structure ===
There are a total of 26 pieces (called cubies) on the puzzle. Out of the nine colours, one colour (green in the picture) only appears on 2 cubies; both of these are corner pieces. The remaining eight colours all appear on 3 cubies each; two of those (red and purple in the picture) appear on three edge pieces, while the other six are on one corner, one edge and one face centre each.

== Number of combinations ==
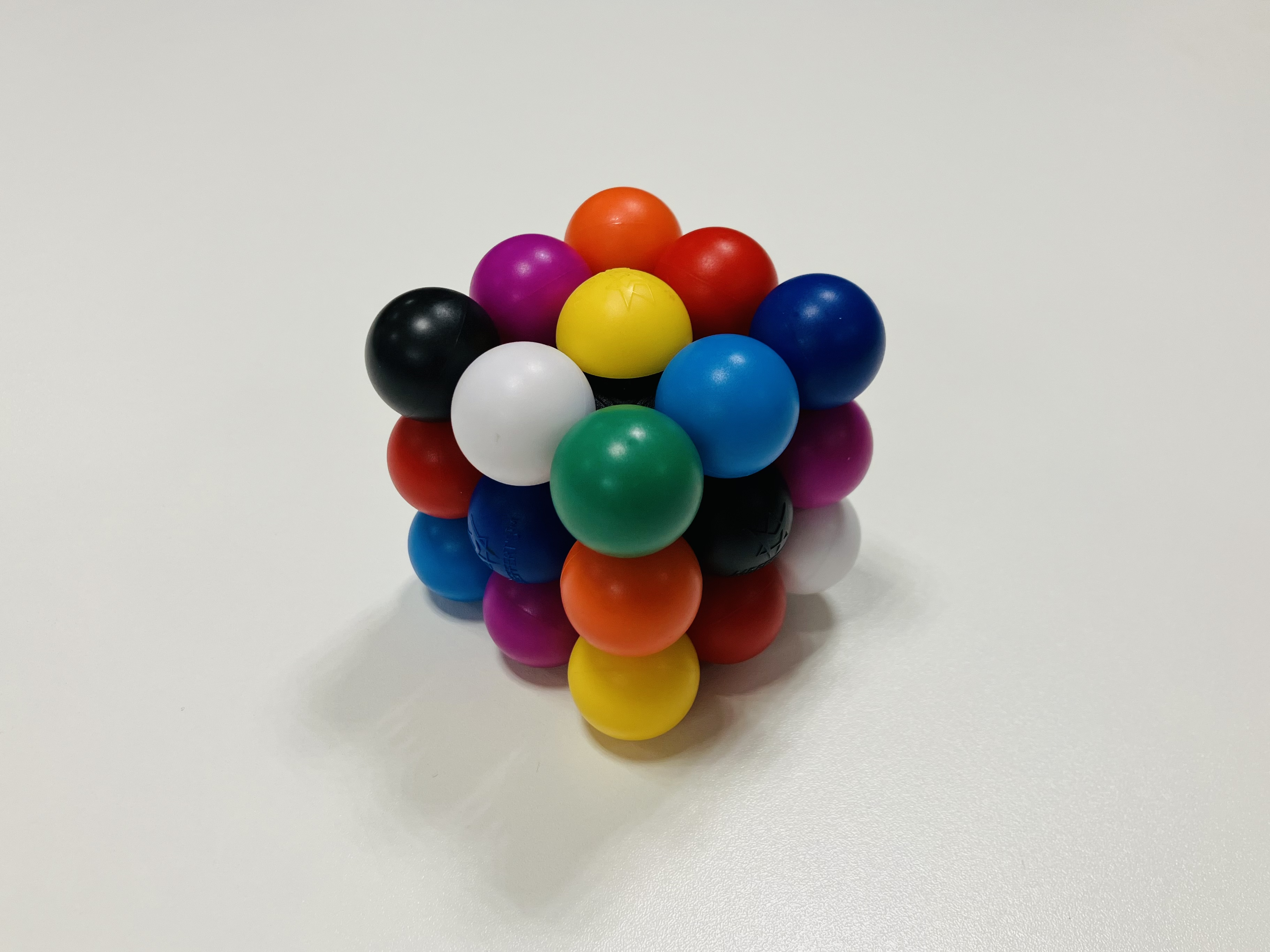
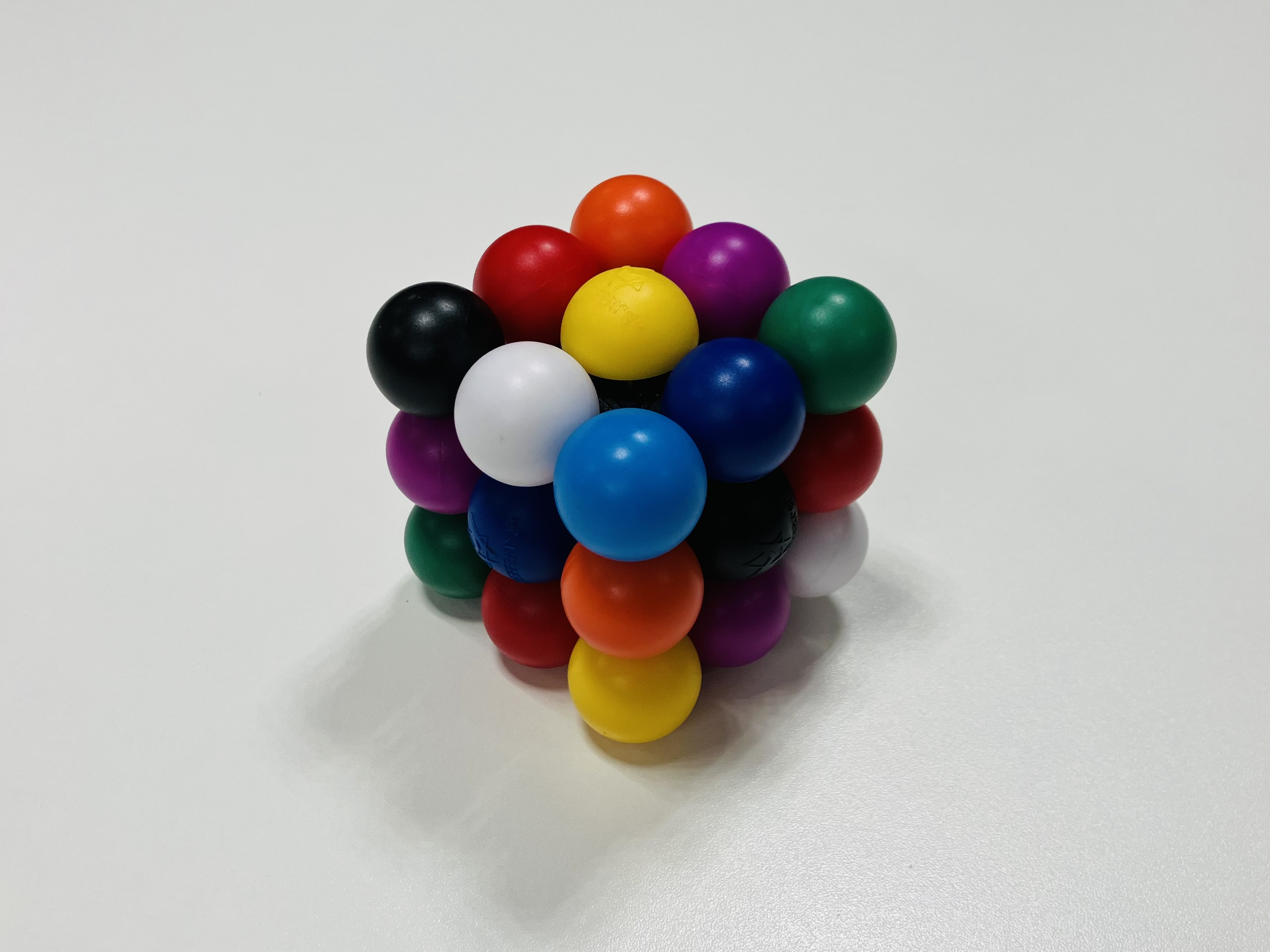
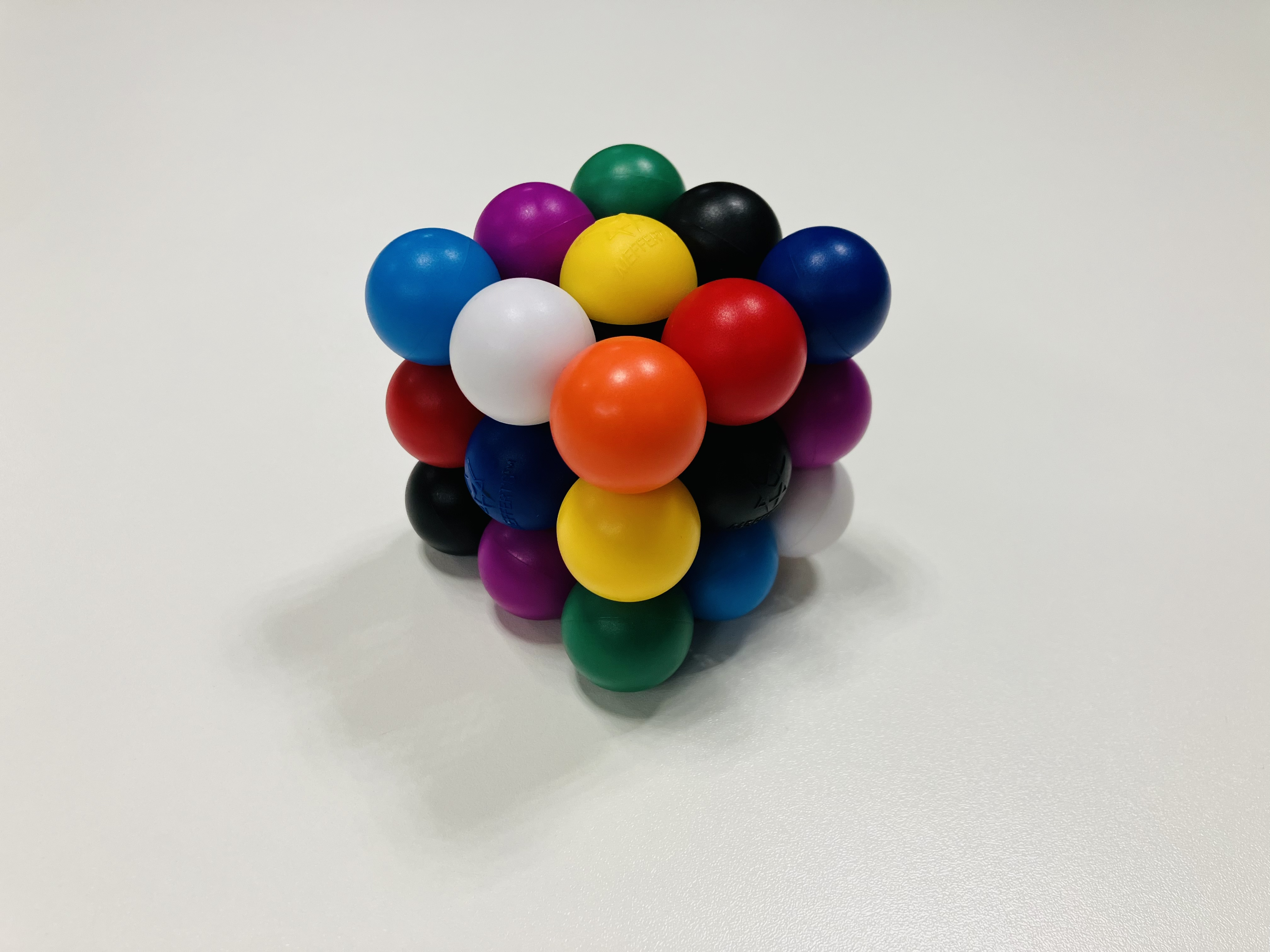
The three types of solutions of a Nine-Colour Cube

The puzzle has eight corner pieces, which can be permutated in 8! different ways, and twelve edge pieces, which can be permutated in 12! ways. The position of the face centre pieces is fixed, therefore there is only one possible permutation for the face centres. Since all cubies only consist of one colour (unlike on the Rubik's Cube), they have no visible orientation and therefore this is not taken into account. The exact number of combinations is not yet reached because of several constraints:

- There is one pair of corner pieces with the same colour; these pieces can be swapped with each other without changing the configuration. This divides the limit by 2!.
- Similarly, there are two triplets of edge pieces with the same colours; these pieces can also be swapped with each other, which divides the limit by 3!^{2}.

As some pieces are identical to each other, there is no parity constraint; all of the above positions are attainable.

The full number is therefore:

$$\frac{12! \times 8!}{2! \times 3!^{2}} = 268\;240\;896\;000$$

=== Solutions ===
Out of the 268 240 896 000 possible configurations, there are 80 that represent a solved puzzle. These solutions fall into three categories:

- The first category consists of the most symmetrical solutions. The corner pieces of the same colour are located at the opposite corners of the cube, while the two edge-only colours form an alternating hexagonal "ring" around the cube, equidistant from the two corners. The three cubies of any of the remaining six colours lie on a diagonal plane that also contains the two similar corners; the colours whose centres are opposite each other lie on the same plane. There are only 8 solutions of this type.
- The second category is similar to the first one in that the two corners of the same colour are still opposite each other and the two edge-only colours still form the hexagonal "ring"; however, this time some edges of the ring are adjacent to the two corners. The colours with opposite centres still lie on the same plane, although the plane may not necessarily align with the two similar corners. There are a total of 24 solutions in this category.
- The solutions in the third category are the least symmetrical. In this category, the two edge-only colours do not form the "ring" around the cube; instead, they form two "semi-rings" which are opposite and perpendicular to each other. The colours with opposite centres do not always lie on the same plane and the planes do not always align with the two similar corners. This is the most common type, with a total of 48 solutions.

== See also ==
- Rubik's Cube
- Sudoku Cube
- Skewb
