= Exponential factorial =

Recursive mathematical formula

In mathematics, the exponential factorial of a positive integer $n$ is a quickly growing function of $n$ defined by iterating the process of exponentiation, analogously to the way that the factorial can be defined by iterated multiplication.

== Definition ==
The exponential factorial is a positive integer $n$ raised to the power of $n-1$, which in turn is raised to the power of $n-2$, and so on in a right-grouping manner. That is,

$$n^{\left((n - 1)^{\left(n - 2)^{\cdot^{\cdot^\cdot}}\right)}\right)}$$

The exponential factorial can also be defined with the recurrence relation

$$a_1 = 1,\quad  a_n = n^{a_{n - 1}}.$$

Using the recurrence relation, the first exponential factorials are:

1
2^{1} = 2
3^{2} = 9
4^{9} = 262144
5^{262144} = 6206069878...8212890625 (183,231 digits)

== Growth rate ==
The exponential factorials were introduced by Dee David Smith, in his 1974 book Orthogonic Taxonomy of Fundamental Concepts. Smith used a notation for the $n$th exponential factorial that enclosed the number $n$ in a three-sided box (leaving the left side open). He asked "whether or not there are other methods that give larger numbers". The answer is yes: these numbers grow quickly, but not more quickly than other known methods.

The exponential factorials exhibit growth equivalent to tetration (in the sense that, for any base $b > e^{1/e}$, the exponential factorial is bounded above and below by expressions of the form $b \uparrow \uparrow (n + c)$ with constant $c$). The exponential factorial of 6 (a number with approximately 5 × 10^{183 230} decimal digits) is larger than a googolplex.

== Reciprocal sum ==
The sum of the reciprocals of the exponential factorials from 1 onwards is the following transcendental number:
$$\begin{align}
&\frac{1}{1}+\frac{1}{2^1}+\frac{1}{3^{2^1}}+\frac{1}{4^{3^{2^1}}}+\frac{1}{5^{4^{3^{2^1}}}}+\frac{1}{6^{5^{4^{3^{2^1}}}}}+\ldots\\
&=1.611114925808376736\underbrace{111111111111\ldots 111111111111}_{183212}272243682859\ldots
\end{align}$$
This sum is transcendental because it is a Liouville number: its partial sums provide a sequence of rational numbers that approximate it more accurately, relative to their denominators, than would be possible for an algebraic number.
