= Data-rate units =

Unit of measurement

Bit rates (data-rate units)
Name	Symbol	Multiple	
bit per second	bit/s	1	1
Metric prefixes (SI)
kilobit per second	kbit/s	10^{3}	1000^{1}
megabit per second	Mbit/s	10^{6}	1000^{2}
gigabit per second	Gbit/s	10^{9}	1000^{3}
terabit per second	Tbit/s	10^{12}	1000^{4}
Binary prefixes (IEC 80000-13)
kibibit per second	Kibit/s	2^{10}	1024^{1}
mebibit per second	Mibit/s	2^{20}	1024^{2}
gibibit per second	Gibit/s	2^{30}	1024^{3}
tebibit per second	Tibit/s	2^{40}	1024^{4}

In telecommunications, data rate units are commonly multiples of bits per second (bit/s) and bytes per second (B/s). For example, the data rates of modern residential high-speed Internet connections are commonly expressed in megabits per second (Mbit/s). They are used as units of measurement for expressing data transfer rate, the average number of bits (bit rate), characters or symbols (symbol rate), or data blocks per unit time passing through a communication link in a data-transmission system.

== Standards for unit symbols and prefixes ==
=== Unit symbol ===
The ISQ symbols for the bit and byte are bit and B, respectively. In the context of data-rate units, one byte consists of 8 bits, and is synonymous with the unit octet. The abbreviation bps is often used to mean bit/s, so that when a 1 Mbps connection is advertised, it usually means that the maximum achievable bandwidth is 1 Mbit/s (one million bits per second), which is 0.125 MB/s (megabyte per second), or about 0.1192 MiB/s (mebibyte per second). The Institute of Electrical and Electronics Engineers (IEEE) uses the symbol b for bit.

=== Unit prefixes ===
In both the SI and ISQ, the prefix k stands for kilo, meaning 1000, while Ki is the symbol for the binary prefix kibi-, meaning 1024. The binary prefixes were introduced in 1998 by the International Electrotechnical Commission (IEC) and in IEEE 1541-2002 which was reaffirmed on 27 March 2008. The letter K is often used as a non-standard abbreviation for 1,024, especially in "KB" to mean KiB, the kilobyte in its binary sense. In the context of data rates, however, typically only decimal prefixes are used, and they have their standard SI interpretation.

=== Variations ===
In 1999, the IEC published Amendment 2 to "IEC 60027-2: Letter symbols to be used in electrical technology – Part 2: Telecommunications and electronics". This standard, approved in 1998, introduced the prefixes kibi-, mebi-, gibi-, tebi-, pebi-, and exbi- to be used in specifying binary multiples of a quantity. The name is derived from the first two letters of the original SI prefixes followed by bi (short for binary). It also clarifies that the SI prefixes are used only to mean powers of 10 and never powers of 2.

== Decimal multiples of bits ==
These units are often used in a manner inconsistent with the IEC standard.

=== Kilobit per second ===
Kilobit per second (symbol kbit/s or kb/s, often abbreviated "kbps") is a unit of data transfer rate equal to:

- 1,000 bits per second
- 125 bytes per second

=== Megabit per second ===
Megabit per second (symbol Mbit/s or Mb/s, often abbreviated "Mbps") is a unit of data transfer rate equal to:

- 1,000 kilobits per second
- 1,000,000 bits per second
- 125,000 bytes per second
- 125 kilobytes per second

=== Gigabit per second ===
Gigabit per second (symbol Gbit/s or Gb/s, often abbreviated "Gbps") is a unit of data transfer rate equal to:

- 1,000 megabits per second
- 1,000,000 kilobits per second
- 1,000,000,000 bits per second
- 125,000,000 bytes per second
- 125 megabytes per second

=== Terabit per second ===
Terabit per second (symbol Tbit/s or Tb/s, sometimes abbreviated "Tbps") is a unit of data transfer rate equal to:

- 1,000 gigabits per second
- 1,000,000 megabits per second
- 1,000,000,000 kilobits per second
- 1,000,000,000,000 bits per second
- 125,000,000,000 bytes per second
- 125 gigabytes per second

=== Petabit per second ===
Petabit per second (symbol Pbit/s or Pb/s, sometimes abbreviated "Pbps") is a unit of data transfer rate equal to:

- 1,000 terabits per second
- 1,000,000 gigabits per second
- 1,000,000,000 megabits per second
- 1,000,000,000,000 kilobits per second
- 1,000,000,000,000,000 bits per second
- 125,000,000,000,000 bytes per second
- 125 terabytes per second

== Decimal multiples of bytes ==
These units are often not used in the suggested ways; see § Variations.

=== Kilobyte per second ===
kilobyte per second (kB/s) (sometimes abbreviated "kBps") is a unit of data transfer rate equal to:

- 8,000 bits per second
- 1,000 bytes per second
- 8 kilobits per second

=== Megabyte per second ===
megabyte per second (MB/s) (can be abbreviated as MBps) is a unit of data transfer rate equal to:

- 8,000,000 bits per second
- 1,000,000 bytes per second
- 1,000 kilobytes per second
- 8 megabits per second

=== Gigabyte per second ===
gigabyte per second (GB/s) (can be abbreviated as GBps) is a unit of data transfer rate equal to:

- 8,000,000,000 bits per second
- 1,000,000,000 bytes per second
- 1,000,000 kilobytes per second
- 1,000 megabytes per second
- 8 gigabits per second

=== Terabyte per second ===
terabyte per second (TB/s) (can be abbreviated as TBps) is a unit of data transfer rate equal to:

- 8,000,000,000,000 bits per second
- 1,000,000,000,000 bytes per second
- 1,000,000,000 kilobytes per second
- 1,000,000 megabytes per second
- 1,000 gigabytes per second
- 8 terabits per second

== Conversion table ==
Name	Symbol	bit per second	byte per second	bit per second (formula)	byte per second (formula)
bit per second	bit/s	1	0.125	1	1/8
byte per second	B/s	8	1	8	1
kilobit per second	kbit/s	1,000	125	10^{3}	1/8 × 10^{3}
kibibit per second	Kibit/s	1,024	128	2^{10}	2^{7}
kilobyte per second	kB/s	8,000	1,000	8 × 10^{3}	10^{3}
kibibyte per second	KiB/s	8,192	1,024	2^{13}	2^{10}
megabit per second	Mbit/s	1,000,000	125,000	10^{6}	1/8 × 10^{6}
mebibit per second	Mibit/s	1,048,576	131,072	2^{20}	2^{17}
megabyte per second	MB/s	8,000,000	1,000,000	8 × 10^{6}	10^{6}
mebibyte per second	MiB/s	8,388,608	1,048,576	2^{23}	2^{20}
gigabit per second	Gbit/s	1,000,000,000	125,000,000	10^{9}	1/8 × 10^{9}
gibibit per second	Gibit/s	1,073,741,824	134,217,728	2^{30}	2^{27}
gigabyte per second	GB/s	8,000,000,000	1,000,000,000	8 × 10^{9}	10^{9}
gibibyte per second	GiB/s	8,589,934,592	1,073,741,824	2^{33}	2^{30}
terabit per second	Tbit/s	1,000,000,000,000	125,000,000,000	10^{12}	1/8 × 10^{12}
tebibit per second	Tibit/s	1,099,511,627,776	137,438,953,472	2^{40}	2^{37}
terabyte per second	TB/s	8,000,000,000,000	1,000,000,000,000	8 × 10^{12}	10^{12}
tebibyte per second	TiB/s	8,796,093,022,208	1,099,511,627,776	2^{43}	2^{40}

== Examples of bit rates ==
Quantity	Unit	bits per second	bytes per second	Field	Description
56	kbit/s	56,000	7,000	Networking	56 kbit modem – 56,000 bit/s
64	kbit/s	64,000	8,000	Networking	64 kbit/s in an ISDN B channel or best quality, uncompressed telephone line.
1,536	kbit/s	1,536,000	192,000	Networking	24 channels of telephone in the US, or a good VTC T1.
10	Mbit/s	10,000,000	1,250,000	Networking	10^{7} bit/s is the speed of classic Ethernet: 10BASE2, 10BASE5, 10BASE-T
10	Mbit/s	10,000,000	1,250,000	Biology	Research suggests that the human retina transmits data to the brain at the rate of ca. 10^{7} bit/s
54	Mbit/s	54,000,000	6,750,000	Networking	802.11g, Wireless G LAN
100	Mbit/s	100,000,000	12,500,000	Networking	Fast Ethernet
600	Mbit/s	600,000,000	75,000,000	Networking	802.11n, Wireless N LAN
1	Gbit/s	1,000,000,000	125,000,000	Networking	1 Gigabit Ethernet
10	Gbit/s	10,000,000,000	1,250,000,000	Networking	10 Gigabit Ethernet
100	Gbit/s	100,000,000,000	12,500,000,000	Networking	100 Gigabit Ethernet
1	Tbit/s	1,000,000,000,000	125,000,000,000	Networking	SEA-ME-WE 4 submarine communications cable – 1.28 terabits per second
4	kbit/s	4,000	500	Audio data	minimum achieved for encoding recognizable speech (using special-purpose speech codecs)
8	kbit/s	8,000	1,000	Audio data	low bit rate telephone quality
32	kbit/s	32,000	4,000	Audio data	MW quality and ADPCM voice in telephony, doubling the capacity of a 30 chan link to 60 ch.
128	kbit/s	128,000	16,000	Audio data	128 kbit/s MP3 – 128,000 bit/s
192	kbit/s	192,000	24,000	Audio data	192 kbit/s MP3 – 192,000 bit/s
1,411.2	kbit/s	1,411,200	176,400	Audio data	CD audio (uncompressed, 16 bit samples × 44.1 kHz × 2 channels)
2	Mbit/s	2,000,000	250,000	Video data	30 channels of telephone audio or a Video Tele-Conference at VHS quality
8	Mbit/s	8,000,000	1,000,000	Video data	DVD quality
27	Mbit/s	27,000,000	3,375,000	Video data	HDTV quality
1.244	Gbit/s	1,244,000,000	155,500,000	Networking	OC-24, a 1.244 Gbit/s SONET data channel
9.953	Gbit/s	9,953,000,000	1,244,125,000	Networking	OC-192, a 9.953 Gbit/s SONET data channel
39.813	Gbit/s	39,813,000,000	4,976,625,000	Networking	OC-768, a 39.813 Gbit/s SONET data channel, the fastest in current use
60	MB/s	480,000,000	60,000,000	Computer data interfaces	USB 2.0 High-Speed
98.3	MB/s	786,432,000	98,304,000	Computer data interfaces	FireWire IEEE 1394b-2002 S800
120	MB/s	960,000,000	120,000,000	Computer data interfaces	Harddrive read, Samsung SpinPoint F1 HD103Uj
133	MB/s	1,064,000,000	133,000,000	Computer data interfaces	Parallel ATA UDMA 6
133	MB/s	1,064,000,000	133,000,000	Computer data interfaces	PCI 32-bit at 33 MHz (standard configuration)
188	MB/s	1,504,000,000	188,000,000	Computer data interfaces	SATA I 1.5 Gbit/s – First generation
375	MB/s	3,000,000,000	375,000,000	Computer data interfaces	SATA II 3 Gbit/s – Second generation
500	MB/s	4,000,000,000	500,000,000	Computer data interfaces	PCI Express x1 v2.0
5.0	Gbit/s	5,000,000,000	625,000,000	Computer data interfaces	USB 5Gbps
750	MB/s	6,000,000,000	750,000,000	Computer data interfaces	SATA III 6 Gbit/s – Third generation
1,067	MB/s	8,533,333,333	1,066,666,667	Computer data interfaces	PCI-X 64 bit 133 MHz
10	Gbit/s	10,000,000,000	1,250,000,000	Computer data interfaces	USB 10Gbps
1,250	MB/s	10,000,000,000	1,250,000,000	Computer data interfaces	Thunderbolt
2,500	MB/s	20,000,000,000	2,500,000,000	Computer data interfaces	Thunderbolt 2
5,000	MB/s	40,000,000,000	5,000,000,000	Computer data interfaces	Thunderbolt 3
8,000	MB/s	64,000,000,000	8,000,000,000	Computer data interfaces	PCI Express x16 v2.0
12,000	MB/s	96,000,000,000	12,000,000,000	Computer data interfaces	InfiniBand 12X QDR
16,000	MB/s	128,000,000,000	16,000,000,000	Computer data interfaces	PCI Express x16 v3.0

== See also ==
- Binary prefix
- Bit rate
- List of interface bit rates
- Orders of magnitude (bit rate)
- Orders of magnitude (data)
- Metric prefix
- Instructions per second
