= Orders of magnitude (bit rate) =

Comparison of a wide range of bit rates

An order of magnitude is generally a factor of ten. A quantity growing by four orders of magnitude implies it has grown by a factor of 10000 or 10^{4}. However, because computers are binary, orders of magnitude are sometimes given as powers of two.

This article presents a list of multiples, sorted by orders of magnitude, for bit rates measured in bits per second. Since some bit rates may measured in other quantities of data or time (like MB/s), information to assist with converting to and from these formats is provided. This article assumes the following:

- A group of 8 bits (8 bit) constitutes one byte (1 B). The byte is the most common unit of measurement of information (megabyte, mebibyte, gigabyte, gibibyte, etc.).
- The decimal SI prefixes kilo, mega etc., are powers of 10. The power of two equivalents are the binary prefixes kibi, mebi, etc.

Accordingly:

- 1 kB (kilobyte) = 1000 bytes = 8000 bits
- 1 KiB (kibibyte) = 2^{10} bytes = 1024 bytes = 8192 bits
- 1 kbit (kilobit) = 125 bytes = 1000 bits
- 1 Kibit (kibibit) = 2^{10} bits = 1024 bits = 128 bytes

Factor (bit/s)	SI prefix	Value	Field	Item
10^{−2}		5.0×10^{−2} bit/s	Text data	Project ELF bit rate for transmitting 3-letter codes to US nuclear submarines
10^{0}	bit/s			
10^{1}		5.0×10^{1} bit/s	Positioning system	Bit rate for transmissions from GPS satellites
10^{1}		5.6×10^{1} bit/s	Text data	Bit rate for a skilled operator in Morse code
10^{3}	kbit/s	4×10^{3} bit/s	Audio data	Minimum achieved for encoding recognizable speech (using special-purpose speech codecs)
10^{3}	kbit/s	8×10^{3} bit/s	Audio data	Low bit rate telephone quality
10^{4}				
10^{4}		3.2×10^{4} bit/s	Audio data	MW quality and ADPCM voice in telephony, doubling the capacity of a 30 channel link to 60 channels
10^{4}		5.6×10^{4} bit/s	Networking	56 kbit/s modem – 56 kbit/s – 56,000 bit/s
10^{4}		6.4×10^{4} bit/s	Networking	64 kbit/s in an ISDN B channel or best quality, uncompressed telephone line.
10^{5}		1.28×10^{5} bit/s	Audio data	128 kbit/s MP3 – 128,000 bit/s
10^{5}		1.92×10^{5} bit/s	Audio data	Nearly CD quality for a file compressed in the MP3 format
10^{6}	Mbit/s	1.4112×10^{6} bit/s	Audio data	CD audio (uncompressed, 16 bit samples × 44.1 kHz × 2 channels)
10^{6}	Mbit/s	1.536×10^{6} bit/s	Networking	24 channels of telephone in the US, or a good VTC T1.
10^{6}	Mbit/s	2×10^{6} bit/s	Video data	30 channels of telephone audio or a Video Tele-Conference at VHS quality
10^{6}	Mbit/s	8×10^{6} bit/s	Video data	DVD quality
10^{7}		1×10^{7} bit/s	Networking	Classic Ethernet
10^{7}		1×10^{7} bit/s	Biology	Human retina transmits data to the brain at the rate of approximately 10^{7} bit/s
10^{7}		2.7×10^{7} bit/s	Video data	HDTV quality
10^{8}		1×10^{8} bit/s	Networking	Fast Ethernet
10^{8}		4.8×10^{8} bit/s	Computer data interfaces	USB 2.0 High-Speed (interface signalling rate)
10^{8}		7.86×10^{8} bit/s	Computer data interfaces	FireWire IEEE 1394b-2002 S800
10^{8}		9.5×10^{8} bit/s	Computer storage	Harddrive read, Samsung SpinPoint F1 HD103Uj
10^{9}	Gbit/s	1×10^{9} bit/s	Networking	Gigabit Ethernet
10^{9}	Gbit/s	1.067×10^{9} bit/s	Computer data interfaces	Parallel ATA UDMA 6; conventional PCI 32 bit 33 MHz – 133 MB/s
10^{9}	Gbit/s	1.244×10^{9} bit/s	Networking	OC-24, a 1.244 Gbit/s SONET data channel
10^{9}	Gbit/s	1.5×10^{9} bit/s	Computer data interfaces	SATA 1.5 Gbit/s – First generation (interface signaling rate)
10^{9}	Gbit/s	2.5×10^{9} bit/s	Computer data interfaces	PCI Express 1.0 ×1 (interface signaling rate)
10^{9}	Gbit/s	3×10^{9} bit/s	Computer data interfaces	SATA 3Gbit/s – Second generation (interface signaling rate)
10^{9}	Gbit/s	5×10^{9} bit/s	Computer data interfaces	USB 3.0 SuperSpeed (interface signaling rate)
10^{9}	Gbit/s	5×10^{9} bit/s	Computer data interfaces	PCI Express 2.0 ×1 (interface signaling rate)
10^{9}	Gbit/s	6×10^{9} bit/s	Computer data interfaces	SATA 6Gbit/s – Third generation (interface signaling rate)
10^{9}	Gbit/s	8×10^{9} bit/s	Computer data interfaces	PCI Express 3.0 ×1 (interface signaling rate)
10^{9}	Gbit/s	8.533×10^{9} bit/s	Computer data interfaces	PCI-X 64 bit 133 MHz – 1,067 MB/s
10^{9}	Gbit/s	9.953×10^{9} bit/s	Networking	OC-192, a 9.953 Gbit/s SONET data channel
10^{10}		1.0×10^{10} bit/s	Computer data interfaces	Thunderbolt
10^{10}		1.0×10^{10} bit/s	Networking	10 Gigabit Ethernet
10^{10}		1.0×10^{10} bit/s	Computer data interfaces	USB 3.1 SuperSpeed 10 Gbit/s (interface signaling rate)
10^{10}		1.6×10^{10} bit/s	Computer data interfaces	PCI Express 4.0 ×1 (interface signaling rate)
10^{10}		3.2×10^{10} bit/s	Computer data interfaces	PCI Express 5.0 ×1 (interface signaling rate)
10^{10}		3.9813×10^{10} bit/s	Networking	OC-768, a 39.813 Gbit/s SONET data channel, the fastest in current use
10^{10}		4.0×10^{10} bit/s	Networking	40 Gigabit Ethernet
10^{10}		4.0×10^{10} bit/s	Computer data interfaces	PCI Express 1.0 ×16 (interface signaling rate)
10^{10}		8.0×10^{10} bit/s	Computer data interfaces	PCI Express 2.0 ×16 (interface signaling rate)
10^{10}		9.6×10^{10} bit/s	Computer data interfaces	InfiniBand 12X QDR
10^{11}		1.0×10^{11} bit/s	Networking	100 Gigabit Ethernet
10^{11}		1.28×10^{11} bit/s	Computer data interfaces	PCI Express 3.0 ×16 (interface signaling rate)
10^{11}		2.0×10^{11} bit/s	Networking	200 Gigabit Ethernet
10^{11}		2.56×10^{11} bit/s	Computer data interfaces	PCI Express 4.0 ×16 (interface signaling rate)
10^{11}		4.0×10^{11} bit/s	Networking	400 Gigabit Ethernet
10^{11}		5.12×10^{11} bit/s	Computer data interfaces	PCI Express 5.0 ×16 (interface signaling rate)
10^{12}	Tbit/s	1.28×10^{12} bit/s	Networking	SEA-ME-WE 4 submarine communications cable – 1.28 terabits per second
10^{12}	Tbit/s	3.84×10^{12} bit/s	Networking	I-ME-WE submarine communications cable – design capacity of 3.84 terabits per second
10^{14}		2.45×10^{14} bit/s	Networking	Projected average global internet traffic in 2015 according to Cisco's 2011 VNI IP traffic forecast
10^{15}	Pbit/s	1.050×10^{15} bit/s	Networking	Data rate over a 14 transmission core optical fiber developed by NEC and Corning researchers.

== See also ==
- Data-rate units
- List of interface bit rates
- Spectral efficiency
- Orders of magnitude (data)
- Orders of magnitude (time)
