= Kilobyte =

Multiple of the unit byte

kilobyte
- Unit system: Unit derived from bit
- Unit of: Digital information, data size
- Symbol: kB

Multiple-byte units
Decimal				Binary					
Value		SI		Value		IEC		JEDEC	
1000	10^{3}	kB	kilobyte	1024	2^{10}	KiB	kibibyte	KB	kilobyte
1000^{2}	10^{6}	MB	megabyte	1024^{2}	2^{20}	MiB	mebibyte	MB	megabyte
1000^{3}	10^{9}	GB	gigabyte	1024^{3}	2^{30}	GiB	gibibyte	GB	gigabyte
1000^{4}	10^{12}	TB	terabyte	1024^{4}	2^{40}	TiB	tebibyte	TB	terabyte
1000^{5}	10^{15}	PB	petabyte	1024^{5}	2^{50}	PiB	pebibyte	—	
1000^{6}	10^{18}	EB	exabyte	1024^{6}	2^{60}	EiB	exbibyte	—	
1000^{7}	10^{21}	ZB	zettabyte	1024^{7}	2^{70}	ZiB	zebibyte	—	
1000^{8}	10^{24}	YB	yottabyte	1024^{8}	2^{80}	YiB	yobibyte	—	
1000^{9}	10^{27}	RB	ronnabyte	1024^{9}	2^{90}	RiB	robibyte	—	
1000^{10}	10^{30}	QB	quettabyte	1024^{10}	2^{100}	QiB	quebibyte	—	
Orders of magnitude of data

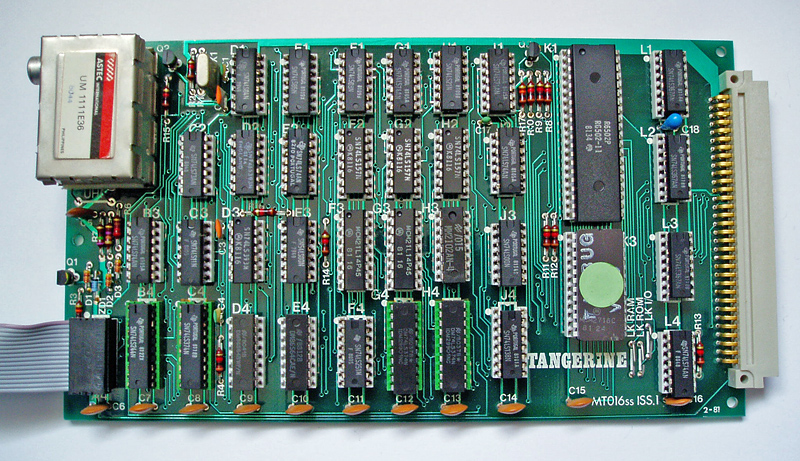
Board of the Tangerine Microtan 65, featuring 1024 bytes of RAM. First sold in 1979.

The kilobyte is a multiple of the unit byte for digital information.

The International System of Units (SI) defines the prefix kilo as a multiplication factor of 1000 (10^{3}); therefore, one kilobyte is 1000 bytes. The internationally recommended unit symbol for the kilobyte is kB.

In some areas of information technology, particularly in reference to random-access memory capacity, kilobyte instead often refers to 1024 (2^{10}) bytes. This arises from the prevalence of sizes that are powers of two in modern digital memory architectures, coupled with the coincidence that 2^{10} differs from 10^{3} by 2.4%.

The kibibyte is defined as 1024 bytes, avoiding the ambiguity issues of the kilobyte.

== Definitions and usage ==
=== Decimal (1000 bytes) ===
In the International System of Units (SI) the metric prefix kilo means 1,000 (10^{3}); therefore, one kilobyte is 1000 bytes. The unit symbol is kB.

This is the definition standardised by the International Electrotechnical Commission (IEC). This definition, and the related definitions of the prefixes mega (1,000,000), giga (1,000,000,000), etc., are most commonly used for data transfer rates in computer networks, internal bus, hard drive and flash media transfer speeds, and for the capacities of most storage media, particularly hard disk drives, flash-based storage, and DVDs. It is also consistent with the other uses of the metric prefixes in computing, such as CPU clock speeds or measures of performance.

The international standard IEC 80000-13 uses the term "byte" to mean eight bits (1 B = 8 bit). Therefore, 1 kB = 8000 bit. One thousand kilobytes (1000 kB) is equal to one megabyte (1 MB), where 1 MB is one million bytes.

=== Binary (1024 bytes) ===
The term kilobyte has traditionally been used to refer to 1024 bytes (2^{10} B). The usage of the metric prefix kilo for binary multiples arose as a convenience, because 1024 is approximately 1000.

The binary interpretation of metric prefixes is still prominently used by the Microsoft Windows operating system. Binary interpretation is also used for random-access memory capacity, such as main memory and CPU cache size, due to the prevalent binary addressing of memory.

The binary meaning of the kilobyte for 1024 bytes typically uses the symbol KB, with an uppercase letter K. The B is sometimes omitted in informal use. For example, a processor with 65,536 bytes of cache memory might be said to have "64 K" of cache. In this convention, one thousand and twenty-four kilobytes (1024 KB) is equal to one megabyte (1 MB), where 1 MB is 1024^{2} bytes.

In December 1998, the IEC addressed such multiple usages and definitions by creating prefixes such as kibi, mebi, gibi, etc., to unambiguously denote powers of 1024. Thus the kibibyte, symbol KiB, represents 2^{10} bytes = 1024 bytes. These prefixes are now part of IEC 80000-13. The IEC further specified that the kilobyte should only be used to refer to 1000 bytes. The International System of Units restricts the use of the SI prefixes strictly to powers of 10.

== Use of term ==
- The Shugart SA-400 5 1/4-inch floppy disk (1976) held 109,375 bytes unformatted, and was advertised as "110 Kbyte", using the 1000 convention. Likewise, the 8-inch DEC RX01 floppy (1975) held 256,256 bytes formatted, and was advertised as "256k". On the other hand, the Tandon 5 1/4-inch DD floppy format (1978) held 368,640 (which is 360×1024) bytes, but was advertised as "360 KB", following the 1024 convention.
- Early home computer systems would often advertise using the 1024 convention, hence the naming of the Commodore 64, Commodore 128, and the Amstrad CPC 464.
- On modern systems, all versions of Microsoft Windows divide by 1024 and represent a 65,536-byte file as "64 KB". Conversely, Mac OS X Snow Leopard and newer represent this as 66 kB, rounding to the nearest 1000 bytes; file sizes are reported with decimal prefixes.
- As of 2016, the binary interpretation was still used in marketing and billing by some telecommunication companies, such as Vodafone, AT&T, Orange and Telstra.

== Data examples ==
- The Lord's Prayer, in Latin, is 296 bytes (about 0.3 kilobytes).
- The short story The Gift of the Magi, by O. Henry, hosted on Project Gutenberg as an uncompressed plain text file, is 11,203 characters; this is 11.2 kilobytes (dividing by 1,000) or 10.94 kibibytes (dividing by 1,024). The Cask of Amontillado, by Edgar Allan Poe, is 12,843 bytes (12.8 kilobytes or 12.5 kibibytes).
- The size of this article's wikitext source, as of November 2026, is 16.885 kilobytes.
- The novel The Picture of Dorian Gray, by Oscar Wilde, hosted on Project Gutenberg as an uncompressed plain text file, is 428,952 bytes; this is 428.95 kilobytes (428,952 divided by 1,000) and 418.90 kibibytes (divided by 1,024). Great Expectations is 994,639 bytes (994.639 kB), and Moby Dick is 1,191,763 bytes (1,191.763 kB).

== See also ==
- Binary prefix
- Gigabyte § Consumer confusion
- History of the floppy disk
- JEDEC memory standards § Unit prefixes for semiconductor storage capacity
- Timeline of binary prefixes
- Units of information § Size examples
