= Gigabyte =

Unit of digital information

gigabyte
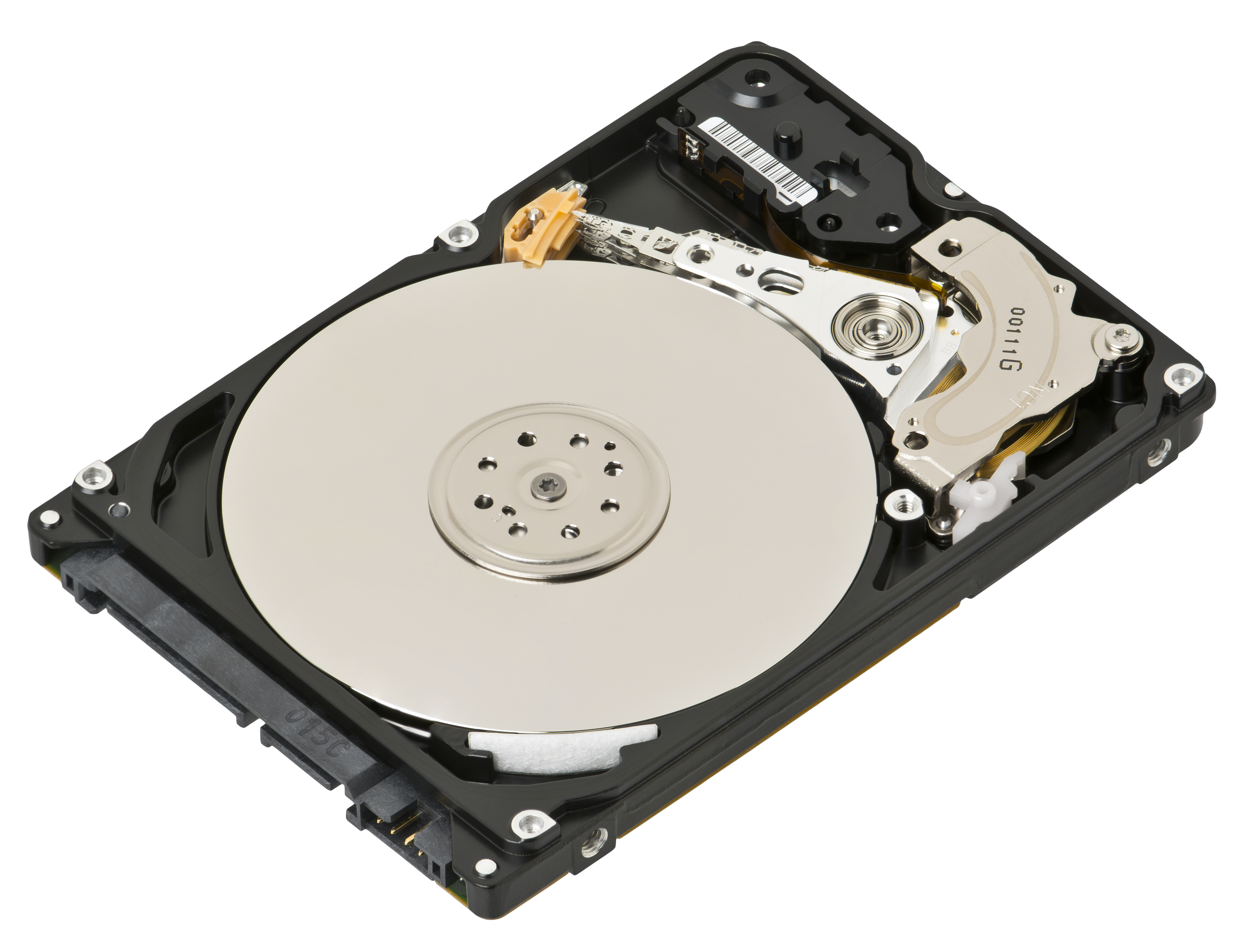
- This 2.5-inch hard drive has a capacity of 500 gigabytes (GB) of data (i.e., 500 billion bytes).

General information
- Unit system: Unit derived from bit
- Unit of: Digital information, data size
- Symbol: GB

Multiple-byte units
Decimal				Binary					
Value		SI		Value		IEC		JEDEC	
1000	10^{3}	kB	kilobyte	1024	2^{10}	KiB	kibibyte	KB	kilobyte
1000^{2}	10^{6}	MB	megabyte	1024^{2}	2^{20}	MiB	mebibyte	MB	megabyte
1000^{3}	10^{9}	GB	gigabyte	1024^{3}	2^{30}	GiB	gibibyte	GB	gigabyte
1000^{4}	10^{12}	TB	terabyte	1024^{4}	2^{40}	TiB	tebibyte	TB	terabyte
1000^{5}	10^{15}	PB	petabyte	1024^{5}	2^{50}	PiB	pebibyte	—	
1000^{6}	10^{18}	EB	exabyte	1024^{6}	2^{60}	EiB	exbibyte	—	
1000^{7}	10^{21}	ZB	zettabyte	1024^{7}	2^{70}	ZiB	zebibyte	—	
1000^{8}	10^{24}	YB	yottabyte	1024^{8}	2^{80}	YiB	yobibyte	—	
1000^{9}	10^{27}	RB	ronnabyte	1024^{9}	2^{90}	RiB	robibyte	—	
1000^{10}	10^{30}	QB	quettabyte	1024^{10}	2^{100}	QiB	quebibyte	—	
Orders of magnitude of data

The gigabyte (/ˈɡɪɡəbaɪt, ˈdʒɪɡəbaɪt/) is a multiple of the unit byte for digital information. The prefix giga- means 10^{9} in the International System of Units (SI). Therefore, one gigabyte is one billion bytes. The unit symbol for the gigabyte is GB.

This definition is used in all contexts of science (especially data science), engineering, business, and many areas of computing, including storage capacities of hard drives, solid-state drives, and tapes, as well as data transmission speeds. The term is also used in some fields of computer science and information technology to denote 1073741824 (1024^{3} or 2^{30}) bytes, however, particularly for sizes of RAM. Thus, some usage of gigabyte has been ambiguous. To resolve this, IEC 80000-13 states that a gigabyte (GB) is 10^{9} bytes and specifies the term gibibyte (GiB) to denote 2^{30} bytes. These differences are still readily seen, for example, when a 400 GB drive's capacity is displayed by Microsoft Windows as 372 GB instead of 372 GiB. Analogously, a memory module that is labeled as having the size "1GB" has one gibibyte (1GiB) of storage capacity. Drives with a capacity of 1 TB (1,000 GB) are reported by the Windows operating system reports as having "931 GB".

In response to litigation over whether the makers of electronic storage devices must conform to Microsoft Windows' use of a binary definition of "GB" instead of the metric/decimal definition, the United States District Court for the Northern District of California rejected that argument, ruling that "the U.S. Congress has deemed the decimal definition of gigabyte to be the 'preferred' one for the purposes of 'U.S. trade and commerce.'"

== Definition ==
The term gigabyte has a standard definition of 1000^{3} bytes, as well as a discouraged meaning of 1024^{3} bytes. The latter binary usage originated as compromise technical jargon for byte multiples that needed to be expressed in a power of 2, but lacked a convenient name. As 1024 (2^{10}) is approximately 1000 (10^{3}), roughly corresponding to SI multiples, it was used for binary multiples as well.

In 1998 the International Electrotechnical Commission (IEC) published standards for binary prefixes, requiring that the gigabyte strictly denote 1000^{3} bytes and gibibyte denote 1024^{3} bytes. By the end of 2007, the IEC Standard had been adopted by the IEEE, EU, and NIST, and in 2009 it was incorporated in the International System of Quantities. Nevertheless, the term gigabyte continues to be widely used with the following two different meanings:

=== Base 10 (decimal) ===
- 1 GB = 1000000000 bytes (= 1000^{3} B = 10^{9} B)

Based on powers of 10, this definition uses the prefix giga- as defined in the International System of Units (SI). This is the recommended definition by the International Electrotechnical Commission (IEC). This definition is used in networking contexts and most storage media, particularly hard drives, flash-based storage, and DVDs, and is also consistent with the other uses of the SI prefix in computing, such as CPU clock speeds or measures of performance. The file manager of Mac OS X version 10.6 and later versions are a notable example of this usage in software, which report files sizes in decimal units.

=== Base 2 (binary) ===
- 1 GiB = 1073741824 bytes (= 1024^{3} B = 2^{30} B).

The binary definition uses powers of the base 2, as does the architectural principle of binary computers. This usage is widely promulgated by some operating systems, such as Microsoft Windows in reference to computer memory (e.g., RAM). This definition is synonymous with the unambiguous unit gibibyte.

== Consumer confusion ==
Since the first disk drive, the IBM 350, disk drive manufacturers expressed hard drive capacities using decimal prefixes. With the advent of gigabyte-range drive capacities, manufacturers labelled many consumer hard drive, solid-state drive and USB flash drive capacities in certain size classes expressed in decimal gigabytes, such as "500 GB". The exact capacity of a given drive model is usually slightly larger than the class designation. Practically all manufacturers of hard disk drives and flash-memory disk devices continue to define one gigabyte as 1000000000bytes, which is displayed on the packaging. Some operating systems such as Mac OS X, iOS, Android, Ubuntu, and Debian express hard drive capacity or file size using decimal multipliers, while others such as Microsoft Windows (including Windows Phone) report file size using binary multipliers. This discrepancy causes confusion, as a disk with an advertised capacity of, for example, 400 GB (meaning 400000000000bytes, equal to 372 GiB) might be reported by the operating system as "372 GB".

For RAM, the JEDEC memory standards use IEEE 100 nomenclature which quote the gigabyte as 1073741824bytes (2^{30} bytes).

The difference between units based on decimal and binary prefixes increases as a semi-logarithmic (linear-log) function—for example, the decimal kilobyte value is nearly 98% of the kibibyte, a megabyte is under 96% of a mebibyte, and a gigabyte is just over 93% of a gibibyte value. This means that a 300 GB (279 GiB) hard disk might be indicated variously as "300 GB", "279 GB" or "279 GiB", depending on the operating system. As storage sizes increase and larger units are used, these differences become more pronounced: a 30,000 GB (27,940 GiB) heat-assisted magnetic recording hard drive might be reported by an operating system using binary units as having a capacity of only 27,490 GB, creating an apparent shortfall of over 2 terabytes.

=== US lawsuits ===
Early lawsuits disputing manufacturers' use of "gigabyte" to mean 10^{9} bytes ended in settlement with no court ruling on the question, such as a lawsuit against drive manufacturer Western Digital. Western Digital settled the challenge and added explicit disclaimers to products that the usable capacity may differ from the advertised capacity. Seagate was sued on similar grounds and also settled.

A later lawsuit, decided in 2019, arose from an alleged breach of contract and other claims over the binary and decimal definitions used for "gigabyte". This lawsuit ended in favour of the manufacturers, with courts holding that the legal definition of gigabyte or GB is 1 GB = 1,000,000,000 (10^{9}) bytes (the decimal definition). Specifically, the courts held that "the U.S. Congress has deemed the decimal definition of gigabyte to be the 'preferred' one for the purposes of 'U.S. trade and commerce'. ... The California Legislature has likewise adopted the decimal system for all 'transactions in this state'."

=== Other contexts ===
Because of their physical design, the capacity of modern computer random-access memory devices, such as DIMM modules, is always a multiple of a power of 1024. It is thus convenient to use prefixes denoting powers of 1024, known as binary prefixes, in describing them. For example, a memory capacity of 1073741824bytes (1024^{3} B) is conveniently expressed as 1 GiB rather than as 1.074 GB. The former specification is, however, often quoted as "1 GB" when applied to random-access memory.

Software allocates memory in varying degrees of granularity as needed to fulfill data structure requirements and binary multiples are usually not required. Other computer capacities and rates, like storage hardware size, data transfer rates, clock speeds, operations per second, etc. are usually presented in decimal units. For example, the manufacturer of a "300 GB" hard drive is claiming a capacity of 300000000000bytes, not 300 × 1024^{3} (which would be 322122547200) bytes.

== Examples of gigabyte-sized storage ==
- One hour of SDTV video at 2.2 Mbit/s is approximately 1 GB.
- Seven minutes of HDTV video at 19.39 Mbit/s is approximately 1 GB.
- 114 minutes of uncompressed CD-quality audio at 1.4 Mbit/s is approximately 1 GB.
- A single-layer DVD+R disc can hold about 4.7 GB.
- A dual-layered DVD+R disc can hold about 8.5 GB.
- A single-layer Blu-ray can hold about 25 GB.
- The largest Nintendo Switch cartridge available on the market holds about 32 GB.
- A dual-layered Blu-ray can hold about 50 GB.
- A triple-layered Ultra HD Blu-ray can hold about 100 GB.

== Unicode character ==
The "gigabyte" symbol is encoded by Unicode at code point U+3387 ㎇ SQUARE GB.

== See also ==
- Orders of magnitude (data)
- Binary prefix
