= TU (time unit) =

In some data communication standards, a time unit (TU) is equal to 1024 microseconds. This unit of time was originally introduced in IEEE 802.11-1999 standard and continues to be used in newer issues of the IEEE 802.11 standard.

In the 802.11 standards, periods of time are generally described as integral numbers of time units. The unit allows for maintaining intervals that are easy to implement in hardware that has a 1 MHz clock (by dividing the clock signal in half ten times, rather than operating a phase-locked loop or digital divider to divide such a clock signal by 1000).

One time unit is equal to one millionth of a kibisecond (1 TU = 10^{−6} Kis).

== See also ==
- Binary prefix
- IEEE 1541
- Jiffy
