= Timeline of binary prefixes =

This timeline of binary prefixes lists events in the history of the evolution, development, and use of units of measure that are germane to the definition of the binary prefixes by the International Electrotechnical Commission (IEC) in 1998, used primarily with units of information such as the bit and the byte.

Historically, computers have used many systems of internal data representation, methods of operating on data elements, and data addressing. Early decimal computers included the ENIAC, UNIVAC 1, IBM 702, IBM 705, IBM 650, IBM 1400 series, and IBM 1620. Early binary addressed computers included Zuse Z3, Colossus, Whirlwind, AN/FSQ-7, IBM 701, IBM 704, IBM 709, IBM 7030, IBM 7090, IBM 7040, IBM System/360, and the DEC PDP-1, PDP-4, PDP-5, and PDP-6.

Decimal systems typically had memory configured in whole decimal multiples, e.g., blocks of 100 and later 1000. The unit abbreviation 'K' or 'k' if it was used, represented multiplication by 1000. Binary memory had sizes of powers of two or small multiples thereof. In this context, 'K' or 'k' was sometimes used to denote multiples of 1024 units or just the approximate size, e.g., either '64K' or '65K' for 65536 (2^{16}).

== 1790s ==
=== 1793 ===
- The French Commission temporaire de Poids & Mesures rêpublicaines, Décrets de la Convention Nationale, proposes the binary prefixes double and demi, denoting a factor of 2 (2^{1}) and 1/2 (2^{−1}), respectively, in 1793.

=== 1795 ===
- The prefixes double and demi are part of the original metric system adopted by France (with kilo for 1000) in 1795. These were not retained when the decadic SI prefixes were internationally adopted by the 11th CGPM conference in 1960.

== 1870s ==
- The British Science Association established metric prefix "mega-" in 1873.

== 1930s ==
- Metric prefixes "kilo-" (established 1795) and "mega-" (established 1873) are widely used as decimal multipliers 1,000 and 1,000,000 for units of frequency and impedance in the electronics industry.
- The Committee of the Verband Deutscher Elektrotechniker publishes suggested names and symbols for the metric prefixes with decimal meaning, i.e., giga (G = 10^{9}) and tera (T = 10^{12}).

== 1940s ==
=== 1943–1944 ===
- J. W. Tukey coins the word "bit" as a contraction of "binary digit".

=== 1947 ===
- "The Whirlwind I Computer is planned with a storage capacity of 2048 numbers of 16 binary digits each."

=== 1948 ===
- Tukey's "bit" is referenced in the work of information theorist Claude Shannon.

== 1950s ==
- In the 1950s, "1 kilobit" meant 1000 bits:
  - "In the '50s, amazingly enough—and only total coincidence—I actually was given the job of writing the operational specifications [...] for what was called cross telling. They handed me this thing and said, 'You're going to define how the hand-over process works between direction centers', [...] and I had no idea what they were talking about. But we had [...] one-kilobit lines connecting the direction centers and I thought, 'Good God! 1000 bits a second. Well, we'll surely be able to figure out something to do with that.'" — Saverah Warenstein, former programmer at Lincoln Laboratory, IBM

=== 1952 ===
- The first magnetic core memory, from the IBM 405 Alphabetical Accounting Machine, is tested successfully in April 1952. (The image shows 10 × 12 cores; presumably one of 8)
  - "Teaming up with a more experienced engineer, [Mike Haynes] built a core memory with just enough capacity to store all the information in an IBM punched card: 960 bits in an 80 × 12 array. In May 1952 it was successfully tested as a data buffer between a Type 405 alphabetical accounting machine and a Type 517 summary punch. This first functional test of a ferrite core memory was made in the same month that a four-times smaller 16 × 16-bit ferrite core array was successfully tested at MIT."
- The IBM 701, a binary-addressed computer containing 72 Williams tubes of 1024 bits each, is released in April.
  - Principles of Operation Type 701 does not use prefixes with lengths of words or size of storage. For example, it specifies that memory tubes hold 2048 words each.
  - The IBM 737 optional magnetic core storage stores 4096 36-bit words. Each plane stored 64 × 64 = 4096 bits.

=== 1955 ===
- The IBM 704 (a binary machine) manual uses decimal arithmetic for powers of two, without prefixes
  - "Magnetic core storage units are available with capacities of either 4096 or 32768 core storage registers; or two magnetic core storage units, each with a capacity of 4096 core storage registers, may be used. Thus, magnetic core storage units are available to give the calculator a capacity of 4096, 8192, or 32768 core storage registers."
  - "Each drum has a storage capacity of 2048 words."

=== 1956 ===
- The IBM 702 (a decimally addressed machine) Preliminary Manual of Information uses decimal arithmetic for powers of ten, without prefixes.
  - "Electrostatic memory is the principal storage medium within the machine. It consists of cathode ray tubes which can store up to 10000 characters of information in the form of electrostatic charges ... Additional storage, as required, may be provided through the use of magnetic drum storage units, each having a capacity of 60000 characters."
  - "A character may be a letter of the alphabet, a decimal number, or any of eleven different punctuation marks or symbols used in report printing."
  - "Each one of the 10000 positions of memory is numbered from 0000 to 9999 and each stored character must occupy one of these positions." (page 8)
- The word byte, meaning eight bits, is coined by Dr. Werner Buchholz in June 1956, during the early design phase for the IBM Stretch computer.
- IBM 650 RAMAC (a decimal addressed machine) announcement
  - "The 650 RAMAC combines the IBM 650 Magnetic Drum Data Processing Machine with a series of disk memory units which are capable of storing a total of 24-million digits. The 305 RAMAC is an entirely new machine which contains its own input and output devices and processing unit as well as a built-in 5-million-digit disk memory."

=== 1957 ===
- The IBM 705 (a decimal addressed machine) Operating manual uses decimal arithmetic for powers of ten, without prefixes.
  - "A total of 40000 characters can be stored within the main storage unit of the Type 705."
  - "Each one of the 40000 positions in memory is numbered from 0000 to 39999." (page 17)
  - "One or more magnetic drums are available as optional equipment with a capacity of 60000 characters each."
- Lewis, W. D., Coordinated broadband mobile telephone system
  - Earliest instance of "kilobit" in both IEEE explore and Google Scholar: "Central controls the mobile link with a rate of 20 kilobits per second, or less".

=== 1958 ===
- "64 million (2^{26}) bytes" is used in a memo by Dr. Werner Buchholz

=== 1959 ===
- The term 32k is used in print to refer to a memory size of 32768 (2^{15}).
  - Real, P. (September 1959). "A generalized analysis of variance program utilizing binary logic". Preprints of papers presented at the 14th national meeting of the Association for Computing Machinery on - ACM '59. ACM Press. pp. 78-1 – 78-5. doi:10.1145/612201.612294. S2CID 14701651. "On a 32k core size 704 computer, approximately 28,000 datum may be analyzed, ... without resorting to auxiliary tape storage." The author is with the Westinghouse Electric Corporation.

== 1960s ==
=== 1960 ===
- The 11th Conférence Générale des Poids et Mesures (CGPM) announces the Système International d'Unités (SI) and adds the decimal metric prefixes giga, and tera, defined as 10^{9} and 10^{12}
- U.S. patent 3,214,691 Frequency Diversity Communications System is filed on May 13, 1960:
  - "In actual construction, the delay line, which provides a total delay from one end to the other of one baud (10 microseconds for a 100 kilobit per second information rate), may be fabricated from lumped parameter elements, i.e., inductors and capacitors, in a well-known manner."
  - "At a 100 kilobit per second information rate, both mark and space signals will generally be transmitted in any 0.0001 sec, interval, and therefore this requirement is easily met with conventional resistors and capacitors."
- Gruenberger, Fred; Burgess, C. R. (October 1960). "Letters to the Editor". Communications of the ACM. 3 (10). doi:10.1145/367415.367419. S2CID 3199685.
  - The 8K core stores were getting fairly common in this country in 1954. The 32K store started mass production in 1956; it is the standard now for large machines and at least 200 machines of the size (or its equivalent in the character addressable machines) are in existence today (and at least 100 were in existence in mid-1959).

=== 1955–1961 ===
- A search of the Computer History Museum's Stretch collection of 931 text documents dated from September 1955 through September 1961 shows no usage of 'k' or 'K' to describe main storage size.

=== 1961 ===
- Gray, L.; Graham, R. (1961). Radio Transmitters. New York, USA: McGraw-Hill. ISBN 978-0-07-024240-1. "In the case of the transmission of business-machine or telemetered data, it is more usual to express the speed in bits or kilobits (1000 bits) per second."
  - Quoted in OED as first instance of "kilobit", though "it is more usual" suggests it is already in common use (see timeline entry for 1957)
- Described device contains 512 words, 24 bits each (= 12288 bits)
- "It is no longer reasonable to spend as much time to transmit an 80-bit address as 12 kilobits of message information – a 1500 to 1 ratio ... We have theoretically and experimentally proved that speech can be compressed from the straightforward requirement for 48 kilobit PCM channel capability to 2400 bits by the application of the Dudley syllabic vocoder."
- The IBM 7090 Data Processing System (a binary machine), Additional Core Storage (65K means 'approximately 65000')
  - "The Additional Core Storage feature for the IBM 7090 Data Processing System provides a second IBM 7302 Core Storage, increasing the capacity of main storage by 32768 words. The block of storage represented by both 7302 units is referred to as "main storage unit".
  - "Additional core storage provides two methods of using main storage: (1) The 65K mode – the computer program is enabled to address both of the main storage units, and (2) the 32K mode—the computer program is able to address only one storage unit, so that main storage capacity available to that program is effectively 32,768 words."
- The IBM 1410 Data Processing System, which used modified decimal addressing, uses decimal arithmetic for powers of ten, without prefixes
  - "Core storage units are available in 10000-, 20000- or 40000-character position capacities."
  - "The matrix switch makes it possible to address any one of the 100 X-drive lines (in a 10K core array)."
  - "The 40K core array requires 40000 valid five-position addresses from 0000 to 39999."
  - "This operation check detects errors in programming that cause invalid addresses. Examples: 40000-and-above on a 40K core array; 20000-and-above on a 20K core array. On a 10K core array, invalid addresses are detected by the address-bus validity check."

=== 1962 ===
- A reference to a "4k IBM 1401" meant 4000 characters of storage (memory).

=== 1963 ===
- Ludwig uses kilobit in the decimal sense
- DEC Serial Drum Type 24
  - "Drums are equipped to store either 64, 128, or 256 data blocks, providing a memory capability of 16384, 32768, or 65536 computer words" (no abbreviations)
- Honeywell 200 Summary Description
  - "The main memory is a magnetic core ... The memory unit supplied as part of the basic central processor has a capacity of 2048 characters, each of which is stored in a separate, addressable, memory location. This capacity may be expanded in modular increments by adding one 2048-character module and additional 4,096-character modules."
  - "Random access disc file and control (disc capacities of up to 100 million characters are available.)"
  - "Up to eight drum storage units can be connected to the Model 270 Random Access Drum Control. Each drum provides storage for 2621441 characters, allowing a total capacity of approximately 21 million characters."

=== 1964 ===
- Gene Amdahl's seminal April 1964 article on IBM System/360 used 1K to mean 1024.
- Leng, Gordon Bell, et al., use K in the binary sense: "The computer has two blocks of 4K, 18-bit words of memory, (1K = 1024 words), attached to its central processor"
- Falkin, Joel; Savastano, Sal (May 1963). "Sorting with large volume, random access, drum storage". Communications of the ACM. 6 (5): 240–244. doi:10.1145/366552.366580. S2CID 11220089. "The Teleregister Telefile data processor includes drum storage whose capacity is far in excess of the requirements for sorting. ... The Telefile data processor provides 16,000 positions in memory, each position storing one binary coded decimal character. A floating accumulator arrangement allows the accumulator to contain any field in memory from 1 to 100 characters in length. All indexing is accomplished programmatically. Input and output tape blocking is fixed at 300 characters per block."
- Data Processing Division press release distributed on April 7, 1964.
  - "System/360 core storage memory capacity ranges from 8000 characters of information to more than 8000000."
- IBM 7090/7094 Support Package for IBM System/360 – November
  - "An IBM 1401 Data Processing System with the following minimum configuration is also required: 1. 4K positions of core storage" U.S. patent 3,317,902 – ADDRESS SELECTION CONTROL APPARATUS – Filed April 6, 1964
  - "To facilitate understanding of the invention, the main storage area has been illustrated as being of 8K capacity; however, it is to be understood that the main storage area may be of larger capacity (e.g., 16K, 32K or 64K) by storing address selection control data in bit positions '2', '1' and '0' of M register 197, respectively."

=== 1965 ===
- "Each IBM 2315 disk cartridge can hold the equivalent of more than one million characters of information.
- "One method of designing a slave memory for instructions is as follows. Suppose that the main memory has 64K words (where K = 1024) and, therefore, 16 address bits, and that the slave memory has 32 words and, therefore, 5 address bits."
- IBM 1620 CPU Model 1 (a decimal machine) System Reference Library, dated 19 July 1965, states:
  - "A core storage module, which is 20000 addressable positions of magnetic core storage, is located in the 1620. Two additional modules are available ... Each core storage module (20000 positions) is made up of 12 core planes as shown in Figure 3. Each core plane contains all cores for a specific bit value."

=== 1966 ===
- U.S. patent 3,435,420 CONTIGUOUS BULK STORAGE ADDRESSING is filed on 3 January 1966
  - "Note that 'K' as used herein indicates 'thousands'. Each storage location in the present embodiment includes 64 data bits and 8 related parity bits, as described herein."
  - "Thus, if only storage unit 1A were provided, it would contain addresses 0 through 32K; storage IB would include addresses between 32K and 64K, storage 2A would contain addresses between 64K and 96K, ...".

=== 1968 ===
- A Univac 9400 disc based computer system ..." can have 2–8 8411 drives for 14.5–58 megabytes capacity. The 8411 has a transfer rate of 156K bytes per second." - using megabytes in a decimal sense
- Donald Morrison proposes to use the Greek letter kappa ("κ") to denote 1024 bytes, "κ^{2}" to denote 1024 × 1024, and so on. (At the time, memory size was small, and only 'K' was in widespread use.)
- Wallace Givens responded with a proposal to use "bK" as an abbreviation for 1024 and "bK2" or "bK^{2}" for 1024 × 1024, though he noted that neither the Greek letter nor lowercase letter "b" would be easy to reproduce on computer printers of the day.
- Bruce Alan Martin of Brookhaven National Laboratory further proposed that the prefixes be abandoned altogether, and the letter B be used to indicate a base-2 exponent in binary scientific notation, similar to E in decimal scientific notation, to create shorthands like 3B20 for 3 × 2^{20}

=== 1969 ===
- IBM 1401 (a decimal machine) Simulator for IBM OS/360
  - "1401 features supported are advanced programming, sense switches, tapes, multiply, divide, 16K core, and all standard instructions except Select Stacker."
  - "1401 core is simulated by 16000 bytes of S/360 core obtained dynamically."
  - "Enough core must be available to allow at least 70K for a problem program area. If tape simulation is not required, this core requirement may be reduced to 50K with the removal of the tape Buffer area."
- U.S. patent 3,638,185 HIGH DENSITY PERMANENT DATA STORAGE AND RETRIEVAL SYSTEM is filed on March 17, 1969, earliest Google Patent search containing "kilobyte".
  - "The data word processor 606 handles the inflow and out-flow of byte-oriented input/output data and interleaved signals at a rate of, for example, 500 kilobytes per second. Instruction processing rates of four to eight per microsecond are required for such a data flow."
- U.S. patent 3,618,041 Memory Control System is filed on October 29, 1969
  - "FIG. 2a shows a practical example of an operand address which consists of, for example 24 bits. It is assumed herein that each block includes 32 bytes, each sector includes 1 kilobyte, the buffer memory 116 includes 4 kilobytes, and read data is represented by one double word or 64 bits, as one word in this case consists of 32 bits."
- IBM System/360 Component Descriptions (IBM 2314 Direct Access Storage Facility)
  - "Each module can store 29.17 million bytes or 58.35 million packed decimal digits ... total on-line storage capacity is 233.4 million bytes"
- "Each 11-disc pack (20 surfaces) has a storage capacity of 29 megabytes; maximum storage capacity with the largest version using a ninth drive as a spare) is 233400000 bytes."
- DEC PDP-11 (a binary-addressed machine) Handbook
  - "PDP-11 addressing modes include ... and direct addressing to 32K words" (Page 2) This appears to be the only use of 'K' in this manual, though; elsewhere sizes are spelled out in full. Contrast the 1973 PDP-11/40 Manual, which defines 'K' as 1024 (below).
- "... each removable disc has a capacity of 2.3 million bytes or 3.07 million 6-bit characters. Up to four drives can be attached to a single controller, resulting in a total storage capacity of 9.2 megabytes." Usage of "million" and "mega-" in decimal sense to describe HDD.

== 1970s ==
=== 1970 ===
- "The following are excerpts from an IBM Data Processing Division press technical fact sheet distributed on 30 June 1970.
  - Users of the Model 165 will have a choice of five main core storage sizes, ranging from 512000 to over 3-million bytes. Seven main memory sizes are available for the Model 155, ranging from 256000 to over 2-million bytes."
- Weiler, Paul W.; Kopp, Richard S.; Dorman, Richard G. (May 1970). "A Real-Time Operating System for Manned Spaceflight". IEEE Transactions on Computers. 19 (5): 388–398. Bibcode:1970ITCmp.100..388W. doi:10.1109/T-C.1970.222936. ISSN 0018-9340. S2CID 38803844. "Each of the five system/360 model 75 computers (Fig. 2) has one megabyte of primary core storage plus four megabytes of large core storage (LCS, IBM 2361)."

=== 1971 ===
- IBM System/360 Operating System: Storage Estimates uses K in a binary sense approximately 450 times, such as "System/360 Configuration: Model 40 with 64K bytes of storage and storage protection". Note the letter "K" is also sometimes used as a variable in this document (see page 23).

=== 1972 ===
- Lin and Mattson introduce the term Mbyte.
  - Lin, Yeong; Mattson, Richard (September 1972). "Cost-performance evaluation of memory hierarchies". IEEE Transactions on Magnetics. 8 (3). IEEE: 390–392. Bibcode:1972ITM.....8..390L. doi:10.1109/TMAG.1972.1067329. "Also, random access devices are advantageous over serial access devices for backing store applications only when the memory capacity is less than 1 Mbyte. For capacities of 4 Mbyte and 16 Mbyte serial access stores with shift register lengths of 256-bit and 1024-bit, respectively, look favorable."

=== 1973 ===
- Habib, Stanley (October 1973). "Notes from industry". ACM SIGMICRO Newsletter. 4 (3). ACM Press: 29. doi:10.1145/1217132.1217137. S2CID 8712609.
  - OCEANPORT, N.J., SEPT. 25, 1973 – A 16-bit minicomputer priced at under $2,000.00 in quantities and a 32-bit minicomputer priced at under $6,000.00 in quantities were introduced today by Interdata, Inc. The 16-bit mini, the Model 7/16, includes an 8KB memory unit in its basic configuration, and will be available for delivery in the first quarter of 1974. The single unit price of the 7/16 is $3,200.00. The 32-bit mini, the Model 7/32, includes a 32KB memory unit and will be available for delivery in the second quarter of 1974. The single unit price of the 7/32 is $9,950.00.
- DEC PDP-11/40 Manual
  - "Direct addressing of 32K 16-bit words or 64K 8-bit bytes (K = 1024)" (Page 1-1) Contrast the 1969 PDP-11 Handbook, which avoids this usage almost everywhere (above).

=== 1974 ===
- The seminal 1974 Winchester HDD article makes extensive use of Mbytes with M being used in the conventional, 10^{6} sense. Arguably all of today's HDD's derive from this technology.
- The October 1974 CDC Product Line Card unambiguously uses MB to characterize HDD capacity in millions of bytes.

=== 1975 ===
- The 15th CGPM defines the SI prefixes peta as 10^{15} and exa as 10^{18}.
- Byte Magazine December 1975 article on IBM 5100 includes the following:
  - "User memory starts at 16K bytes in the minimum configuration and can be expanded to 64K bytes (65,536)."
- Gordon Bell uses the term megabytes:
  - Bell, Gordon; Strecker, William (November 1975). "Computer structures: What have we learned from the PDP-11?" (PDF). Proceedings of the 3rd annual symposium on Computer architecture - ISCA '76. ACM Press. pp. 1–14. doi:10.1145/800110.803541. S2CID 14496112. "memory size (8k bytes to 4 megabytes)."

=== 1976 ===
- DEC RK05/RK05J/RK05F disk drive maintenance manual
  - "Bit Capacities (unformatted)" "25 million" | "50 million" (57600 bits/track × 406 | 812 tracks = 23385600 | 46771200 bits)
- The Memorex 1976 annual report has 10 instances of the use of megabyte to describe storage devices and media.
- Caleus Model 206-306 Maintenance Manual uses 3MB to characterize a drive having 3060000 bytes capacity.
- The first 5 1/4 inch floppy disk drive, the Shugart SA 400, is introduced in August 1976. The drive had 35 tracks and was single sided. The data sheet gives the unformatted capacity as 3125 bytes per track for a total of 109.4 Kbytes (3125 × 35 = 109375). When formatted with 256 byte sectors and 10 sectors per track the capacity is 89.6 Kbytes (256 × 10 × 35 = 89600).

=== 1977 ===
- HP 7905A Disc Drive Operator's Manual
  - "nearly 15 million bytes" with no other abbreviations
- 1977 Disk/Trend Report – Rigid Disk Drives, published June 1977
  - This first edition of the annual report on the hard disk drive industry makes extensive use of MB as 10^{6} bytes. The industry, in 1977, is segmented into nine segments ranging from "Disk Cartridge Drives, up to 12 MB" to "Fixed Disk Drives, over 200 MB." While the categories changed during the next 22 years of publication, Disk/Trend, the principal marketing study of the hard disk drive industry always and consistently categorized the industry in segments using prefixes M and later G in the decimal sense.
- VAX-11/780 Architecture Handbook 1977–78. Copyright 1977 Digital Equipment Corporation.
  - Page 2-1 "physical address space of 1 gigabyte (30 bits of address)" The initial hardware was limited to 2 M bytes of memory utilizing the 4K MOS RAM chips. The VAX11/780 handbooks use M byte and Mbyte in the same paragraph.

=== 1978 ===
- DEC RM02/03 Adapter Technical Description Manual
  - "The RM02 or RM03 Disk Drive (Figure 1-1) is an 80M byte (unformatted; 67M byte formatted) ... storage device ... in the 16-bit format, the maximum storage capacity is 33710080 data words per disk pack" (33710080 × 16 / 8 = 67420160 8-bit bytes)

=== 1979 ===
- Fujitsu M228X Manual
  - "Storage capacity (unformatted)" "67.4 MB", "84.2 MB", etc.
  - "20480 Bytes" per track, 4 tracks per cylinder, 808+15 cylinders = 67420160 bytes
- Sperry Univac Series V77 Microcomputer Systems Brochure, Circa 1978, Printed July 1979
  - Page 5: Table list memory options as 64KB, 128KB, and 256KB. Memory Expansion is up to 2048KB
  - Page 9: "Memory for the V77-800 is available in 128K byte and 256K byte increments up to a maximum of 2 megabytes"
  - Page 21: Moving Head Disks – units up to 232 million byte disk pack systems. Diskette – storage of 0.5 MB per drive.

== 1980s ==
=== 1980 ===
- Shugart Associates Product Brochure, published June 1980 specifies the capacity of its two HDDs using megabytes and MB in a decimal sense, e.g. SA1000 formatted capacity is stated as "8.4 MB" and is 256 × 32 × 1024 = 8388608 bytes.
- Shugart Associates SA410/460 Data Sheet published October 1980 contains capacity specifications as follows:

Formatted Capacity	SA410 Single/Double Density	SA460 Single/Double Density
Per Disk	204.8/409.6 KBytes	409.6/819.2 KBytes
Per Surface	204.8/409.6 KBytes	204.8/409.6 KBytes
Per Track	2.56/5.12 KBytes	2.56/5.12 KBytes
Sectors/Track	10	10

The same data sheet uses MByte in a decimal sense.

=== 1981 ===
- 8086 Object Module Formats
  - "The 8086 MAS is 1 megabyte (1048576)"
- Quantum Q2000 8" Media Fixed Disk Drive Service Manual
  - "four models ... the Q2010 having an unformatted 10.66 Mb capacity on one disk platter and two heads, the ... 21.33 Mb ... 32.00 Mb ... 42.66 Mb"
  - (1024 tracks × "10.40Kb" per track = 10649 "Kb", which they write as "10.66Mb", so 1 "Mb" = 1000 "Kb")
  - (256 Bytes per sector, 32 Sectors/tk = 8192 bytes, which they write as "8.20Kb" per track)
  - "Storage capacity of 10, 20, 30, or 40 megabytes"
  - 4.34M bits/second transfer rate"
- Apple Disk III data sheet
  - "Formatted Data Capacity: 140K bytes"
  - Apple uses K in a binary sense since the actual formatted capacity is 35 tracks × 16 sectors/track × 256 bytes/sector = 140 KiB = 143.360 kB

=== 1982 ===
- Brochure for the IBM Personal Computer (PC)
  - "User memory: 16KB to more than 512KB", "single-sided 160KB or double-sided 320KB diskette drives"
- IBM Technical Reference: Personal Computer Hardware Reference Library
  - "The drives are soft sectored, single or double sided, with 40 tracks per side. They are Modified Frequency Modulation (MFM) coded in 512 byte sectors, giving a formatted capacity of 163840 bytes per drive for single sided and 327680 bytes per drive for double sided."
- Seagate ST 506/412 OEM Manual
  - "Total formatted capacity [...] is 5/10 megabytes (32 sectors per track, 256 bytes per sector, 612/1224 tracks)"

=== 1983 ===
- IBM S/360 S/370 Principles Of Operation GA22-7000 includes as statement:
  - "In this publication, the letters K, M and G denote the multipliers 2^{10}, 2^{20} and 2^{30} respectively. Although the letters are borrowed from the decimal system and stand for kilo 10^{3}, mega 10^{6} and giga 10^{9} they do not have decimal meaning but instead present the power of 2 closest to the corresponding power of 10."
- IBM 341 4-inch Diskette Drive
  - unformatted capacity "358087 bytes"
  - "Total unformatted capacity (in kilobytes): 358.0"
- Maxtor XT-1000 brochure
  - "Capacity, unformatted" 9.57 MB per surface = 10,416 bytes per track × 918 tracks per surface = 9,561,888 byte (decimal MB)
- Shugart Associates SA300/350 Data Sheet published c. November 1983 (one of the first MIC standard 3.5" FDDs) contains capacity specifications as follows:

Formatted Capacity	Single Sided Single/Double Density	Double Sided Single/Double Density
Per Disk	204.8/409.6 kbytes	409.6/819.2 kbytes
Per Surface	204.8/409.6 kbytes	204.8/409.6 kbytes
Per Track	2.56/5.12 kbytes	2.56/5.12 kbytes
Sectors/Track	10	10

Shugart Associates, one of the leading FD companies used k in a decimal sense.

=== 1984 ===
- The Macintosh Operating System is the earliest known operating system using the prefix K in a binary sense to report both memory size and HDD capacity.
  - In the original 1984 Apple Macintosh ad, page 8, Apple characterized its 3 1/2 floppy disk as "400K", that is, 800 × 512 byte sectors or 409600 bytes = 400 KiB. Similarly, the February 1984 Byte Magazine review describes the FD as "400K bytes".

=== 1985 ===
- Exabyte Corp. founded
- September 1985. Apple introduced Macintosh Finder 5.0 with HFS (Hierarchical File System)along with the Mac's first hard drive, the Hard Disk 20. Finder 5.x displayed drive capacity in binary K units. The Hard Disk 20 Manual specified the HDD as having
  - "Data capacity (formatted): 20769280 bytes
  - Bytes per block: 532 (512 user data, 20 system data)
  - Total disk blocks: 39040
- and has the following definition in its glossary:
  megabyte
  Approximately one million bytes (1048567) of information. A 20 megabyte hard disk holds 20 million bytes of information, or 20,000 kilobytes (20,000K) (Apple Hard Disk 20 Manual)
  The user data is 39040 × 512 = 19988480 bytes here.

=== 1986 ===
- Apple IIgs introduced September 1986
  - ProDos16 uses MB in a binary sense.
  - Similar usage in "ProDOS Technical Reference Manual" (c) 1985, p. 5 & p. 163
- Digital Large System Mass Storage Handbook (c) dated September 1986
  - "GByte: An abbreviation for one billion (one thousand million) bytes." p. 442
  - "M: An abbreviation for one million. Typically combined with a unit of measure, such as bytes (MBytes), or Hertz (MHz)." p. 444
- SI prefixes with both standard decimal and nonstandard binary senses given together in a standard (ANSI/IEEE 1084)

=== 1987 ===
- Seagate Universal Installation Handbook
  - ST125 listed as 21 "Megabytes" formatted capacity, later document seems to confirm that this is decimal
- Disk/Trend Report – Rigid Disk Drives, October 1987
  - First use of GB in a decimal sense in this HDD marketing survey; Figure 1 states "FIXED DISK DRIVES more than 1 GB" market size as $10,786.6 million.
- Webster's Ninth New Collegiate Dictionary (1987) has binary definitions for kilobyte and megabyte.
  - kilobyte n [from the fact that 1024 (2^{10}) is the power of 2 closest to 1000] (1970): 1024 bytes
  - megabyte n (1970): 1048576 bytes

=== 1988 ===
- Imprimis Wren VII 5 1/4 Inch Rigid Disk Drive Data Sheet, printed 11/88
  - "Capacity of 1.2 gigabyte (GB)"

=== 1989 ===
- IBM Enterprise Systems Architecture/370, Reference Summary (GX20-0406-0), p. 50 (the last page), has a two table, one to recap the decimal value of power of 2 and 16 to 2^{60}, and one that read:

Symbol	Value
K (kilo)	1024 = 2^{10}
M (mega)	1048576 = 2^{20}
G (giga)	1073741824 = 2^{30}

- Electronic News, 25 September 1989, "Market 1.5GB Drives"
  - "Imprimis and Maxtor are the only two drive makers to offer the new generation of drives in the 1.5GB capacity range ..."
  - "IBM, Hewlett-Packard, Fujitsu, Toshiba, Hitachi and Micropolis are expected to enter the market for 1.5GB capacity..."

== 1990s ==
=== 1990 ===
- Matsuda et al. refer to 1024 bits (32 × 32 optoelectronic switches) as "1-kb memory".
- GEOS ad
  - "512K of memory"
- The enhanced DOS command line processor 4DOS 3.00 supports a number of additional conditions (DISKFREE, DOSMEM/DOSFREE, EMS, EXTENDED, FILESIZE and XMS) in IF commands, which allow to test for sizes in bytes, kilobytes (by appending a K) or megabytes (by appending an M), where 1K is defined as 1024 bytes and 1M is defined as 1024 × 1024 bytes.
- DEC RA90/RA92 Disk Drive Service Manual
  - "RA90 Disk Drive ... Storage capacity, formatted 1.216 gigabytes" (512 bytes/sector × 69 sectors/track × 34437 tracks = 1216590336 bytes)

=== 1991 ===
- The 19th CGPM defines the SI prefixes zetta, and yotta as 10^{21} and 10^{24}.
- May 13: Apple releases Macintosh System 7 containing Finder 7.0, which uses M in a binary sense to describe HDD capacity.
- The HP 95LX uses "1MB" in a binary sense to describe its RAM capacity.
- Micropolis 1528 Rigid Disk Drive Product Description
  - "1.53 GBytes" ... "Up to 1.53 gigabytes (unformatted) per drive" "MBytes/Unit: 1531.1" (2100 × 48608 × 15 = 1531152000)
- Similar to a feature in 4DOS 3.00, the enhanced command line processor 4DOS 4.00 adds support for a number of variable functions (like %@FILESIZE[...]%), taking special arguments to control the format of the returned values: The lowercase letters k and m are used as decimal prefixes, whereas the uppercase letters K and M are used in their binary meaning.
- T. Smith, W. Moorman and T. Dang refer to 2^{20} microseconds as a "mega-microsecond (MUS)", mixing binary use of the prefix "mega-" with the conventional decimal prefix micro.

=== 1993 ===
- While the HP 48G calculators are labelled 32K or 128K to describe their built-in SRAM capacity in a binary sense, the user manual variably uses the terms KB, KBytes and kilobytes in the same meaning.
- The enhanced command line processor 4DOS 5.00 introduces the concept of a general size range parameter /[smin,max] for file selection, recognizing lowercase letters k and m as decimal prefixes and uppercase letters K and M as binary prefixes.
- Byte defined as 8 bits (ISO/IEC 2382-1)

=== 1994 ===
- Feb: Microsoft Windows for Workgroup 3.11 File Manager uses MB in a binary sense to describe HDD capacity. Prior versions of Windows only used K in a binary sense to describe HDD capacity.
- Micropolis 4410 Disk Drive Information
  - "1,052 MB Formatted Capacity"
  - "Unformatted Per Drive 1,205 MB" (133.85 MB per surface, 9 read-write heads)
- The HP 200LX models use "1MB"/"2MB"/"4MB" in a binary sense to describe their RAM capacity.

=== 1995 ===
- August: The International Union of Pure and Applied Chemistry's Interdivisional Committee on Nomenclature and Symbols proposed new prefixes kibi (from kilobinary), mebi, gibi, and tebi for powers of 1024; using the symbols kb, Mb, Gb, and Tb respectively (e.g. giving kbB for kibibyte).

=== 1996 ===
- FOLDOC defines the exabyte (1 EB) as 1024 petabytes (1024 PB), with petabyte used in the binary sense of 1024^{5} B.
- Markus Kuhn proposes a system with di prefixes, like the "dikilobyte" (K_{2}B) and "digigabyte" (G_{2}B). It did not see significant adoption.

=== 1997 ===
- January: Bruce Barrow endorses the International Union of Pure and Applied Chemistry's proposal for prefixes kibi, mebi, gibi, and tebi in "A Lesson in Megabytes" in IEEE Standards Bearer, but instead using the symbols Ki, Mi, Gi, and Ti.
- IEEE requires prefixes to take the standard SI meaning (e.g., mega always to mean 1000^{2}). Exceptions for binary meaning (mega to mean 1024^{2}) are permitted as an interim measure (where pointed out on a case-by-case basis) until a binary prefix could be standardised.
- FOLDOC defines the zettabyte (1 ZB) as 1024 exabytes (1024 EB) and the yottabyte (1 YB) as 1024 zettabytes (1024 ZB).
- IEEE SCC14 proposes prefixes Ki, Mi, Gi and Ti

=== 1998 ===
- December: IEC establishes unambiguous prefixes for binary multiples (KiB, MiB, GiB, TiB, PiB and EiB), reserving kB, MB, GB and so on for their decimal sense. Formally published in January 1999.

=== 1999 ===
- Donald Knuth, who uses decimal notation like 1 MB = 1000 kB, expresses "astonishment" that the proposal was adopted by the IEC, calling them "funny-sounding", and proposes that the powers of 1024 be designated as "large kilobytes" and "large megabytes" (abbreviated KKB and MMB, as "doubling the letter connotes both binary-ness and large-ness"). Double prefixes were formerly used in the metric system, however, with a multiplicative meaning ("MMB" would be equivalent to "TB"), and this proposed usage never gained any traction.
- In their November 1999 paper, Steven W. Schlosser, John Linwood Griffin, David F. Nagle and Gregory R. Ganger adopt the symbol GiB for gibibyte and quote data throughput in mebibytes per second
  - "... Although these numbers appear to yield a capacity of 2.98 GiB per sled, the capacity decreases ... This yields an effective capacity of about 2.098 GiB per sled. ..."
  - "maximum throughput (MiB/s)"
- The IEEE 802.11-1999 standard introduces the time unit TU defined as 1024 μs.

== 2000s ==
=== 2001 ===
- IBM, z/Architecture, Reference Summary
  - Page 59, list the power of 2 and 16, and their decimal value. There is a column name 'Symbol', which list K (kilo), M (mega), G (giga), T (tera), P (peta) and E (exa) for the power of 2 of, respectively, 10, 20, 30, 40, 50, 60.
- Peuhkuri adopts IEC prefixes in his paper at the 2001 Internet Measurement Conference: "... allows maximum size of 224 that requires 1 GiB of RAM ... or acknowledgement numer [sic] is within 32 KiB range. ... on a PC with Celeron processor with 512 MiB of memory ..."
- The Linux kernel uses IEC prefixes.

=== 2002 ===
- Marcus Kuhn introduces the term kibihertz to mean 1024 Hz.
  - "Most embedded clocks (state of the art is still a calibrated 32 kibihertz crystal) have a frequency error of at least 10^{−5} (10 ppm), and therefore drift away from the TAI rate faster than 1 second per week."
- Mackenzie et al 2002:
  - use tebibyte (TiB), pebibyte (PiB), exbibyte (EiB)
  - use the symbols ZiB, YiB, accompanied by notes explaining that these are "a GNU extension to IEC 60027-2"
- JEDEC publishes the standard JESD100B.01, which lists the prefixes K, M and G qualified "as a prefix to units of semiconductor storage capacity", in "contrast with the SI prefix mega (M) equal to 10^{6}, as in a 1-Mb/s data transfer rate, which is equal to 1000000 bits per second." A table lists the binary prefixes kibi Ki (2^{10})^{1}, mebi Mi (2^{10})^{2}, gibi Gi (2^{10})^{3}, tebi Ti (2^{10})^{4} and the decimal prefixes kilo (10^{3})^{1}, mega (10^{3})^{2}, giga (10^{3})^{3}, tera (10^{3})^{4}.

=== 2003 ===
- The World Wide Web Consortium publishes a Working Group Note describing how to incorporate IEC prefixes into mathematical markup.

=== 2004 ===
- 2004 revision of IEEE Standard Letter Symbols for Units of Measurement (SI Units, Customary Inch-Pound Units, and Certain Other Units), IEEE Std 260.1, incorporates IEC definitions for KiB, MiB etc., reserving the symbols kB, MB etc. for their decimal counterparts.
- Chris Hurley refers to 1.024 milliseconds as a "kilomicrosecond", mixing binary use of the prefix "kilo" with the conventional decimal prefix micro.
- Thomas Maufer draws an equivalence between the "kilo-microsecond" and "Time Unit" (TU) that was introduced by the IEEE 802.11-1999 standard.

=== 2005 ===
- IEC extends binary prefixes to include zebi (Zi) and yobi (Yi)
- IEC prefixes are adopted by the IEEE after a two-year trial period.
  - On March 19, 2005, the IEEE standard IEEE 1541-2002 (Prefixes for Binary Multiples) was elevated to a full-use standard by the IEEE Standards Association after a two-year trial period.

=== 2006 ===
- The BIPM publishes the 8th SI Brochure including the note
  "These SI prefixes refer strictly to powers of 10. They should not be used to indicate powers of 2 [...]. The IEC has adopted prefixes for binary powers [...]. Although these prefixes are not part of the SI, they should be used in the field of information technology to avoid the incorrect usage of the SI prefixes."
- In addition to the k and m decimal as well as the K and M binary prefixes, 4DOS 7.50.141 (2006-12-24) adds support for g and G as decimal respective binary prefixes in variable functions and size range parameters.

=== 2007 ===
- Windows Vista still uses the binary conventions (e.g., 1 KB = 1024 bytes, 1 MB = 1048576 bytes) for file and drive sizes, and for data rates
- GParted uses IEC prefixes for partition sizes
- Advanced Packaging Tool and Synaptic Package Manager use standard SI prefixes for file sizes
- IBM uses "exabyte" to mean 1024^{6} bytes. "Each address space, called a 64-bit address space, is 16 exabytes (EB) in size; an exabyte is slightly more than one billion gigabytes. The new address space has logically 2^{64} addresses. It is 8 billion times the size of the former 2-gigabyte address space, or 18,446,744,073,709,600,000 bytes."
- Edward Michael McDonald III uses the terms zebibyte, yobibyte to mean 2^{70} and 2^{80} bytes, respectively, pointing out the need to distinguish between decimal and binary prefixes when dealing with the storage capacity of high performance computers.

=== 2008 ===
- The US National Institute of Standards and Technology guidelines prohibit use of SI prefixes k, M, ... in the binary sense, and suggest IEC prefixes Ki, Mi ... for binary multiples
  - p. 29, "The names and symbols for the prefixes corresponding to 2^{10}, 2^{20}, 2^{30}, 2^{40}, 2^{50}, and 2^{60} are, respectively: kibi, Ki; mebi, Mi; gibi, Gi; tebi, Ti; pebi, Pi; and exbi, Ei. Thus, for example, one kibibyte is also written as 1 KiB = 2^{10} B = 1024 B, where B denotes the unit byte. Although these prefixes are not part of the SI, they should be used in the field of information technology to avoid the non-standard usage of the SI prefixes."
- The binary prefixes are defined in IEC Standard IEC 80000-13, formally incorporating them into the ISO/IEC series of standards of quantities and units.
- IBM WebSphere describes data transfer using unambiguous IEC prefixes
  - "Current file. The name of the file currently being transferred. The part of the individual file that has already been transferred is displayed in B, KiB, MiB, GiB, or TiB along with total size of the file in parentheses. The unit of measurement displayed depends on the size of the file. B is bytes per second. KiB/s is kibibytes per second, where 1 kibibyte equals 1024 bytes. MiB/s is mebibytes per second, where 1 mebibyte equals 1048576 bytes. GiB/s is gibibytes per second where 1 gibibyte equals 1073741824 bytes. TiB/s is tebibytes per second where 1 tebibyte equals 1099511627776 bytes."
  - "The rate the file is being transferred in KiB/s (kibibytes per second, where 1 kibibyte equals 1024 bytes.)"

=== 2009 ===
- Apple Inc. uses the SI decimal definitions for capacity (e.g., 1 kilobyte = 1000 bytes) in the Mac OS X v10.6 operating system to conform with standards body recommendations and avoid conflict with hard drive manufacturers' specifications.
- Frank Löffler and co-workers report disk size and computer memory in tebibytes.
  - "For the largest simulations using 2048 cores this sums up to about 650 GiB per complete checkpoint and about 6.4 TiB in total (for 10 checkpoints)."
- the SourceForge web site
  - "For example, in 2009, the SourceForge web site reported file sizes using binary prefixes for several months before changing back to SI prefixes but switching the file sizes to powers of ten."
- The binary prefixes, as defined by IEC 80000-13, are incorporated into ISO 80000-1, including a note that "SI prefixes refer strictly to powers of 10, and should not be used for powers of 2." In ISO 80000-1, the application of the binary prefixes is not limited to computer technology. For example, 1 KiHz = 1024 Hz.

== 2010s ==
=== 2010 ===
- The Ubuntu operating system uses the SI prefixes for base-10 numbers and IEC prefixes for base-2 numbers as of the 10.10 release.
- Baba Arimilli and co-workers use the pebibyte (PiB) for computer memory and disk storage and exbibyte (EiB) for archival storage
  - "Blue Waters will comprise more than 300.000 POWER7 cores, more than 1 PiB memory, more than 10 PiB disk storage, more than 0.5 EiB archival storage, and achieve around 10 PF/s peak performance."
- Hewlett-Packard (HP) publishes a leaflet explaining use of SI and binary prefixes "To reduce confusion, vendors are pursuing one of two remedies: they are changing SI prefixes to the new binary prefixes, or they are recalculating the numbers as powers of ten."
  - "For disk and file capacities, the latter remedy is more popular because it is much easier to recognize that 300 GB is the same as 300,000 MB than to recognize that 279.4 GiB is the same as 286,102 MiB."
  - "For memory capacities, binary prefixes are more natural. For example, reporting a Smart Array controller cache size of 512 MiB is preferable to reporting it as 536.9 MB."
  - "HP is considering modifying its storage utilities to report disk capacity with correct decimal and binary values side-by-side (for example, '300 GB (279.4 GiB)'), and report cache sizes with binary prefixes ('1 GiB')."

=== 2011 ===
- The GNU operating system uses the SI prefixes for base-10 numbers and IEC prefixes for base-2 numbers as of the parted-2.4 release (May 2011).
  - "specifying partition start or end values using MiB, GiB, etc. suffixes now makes parted do what I want, i.e., use that precise value, and not some other that is up to 500KiB or 500MiB away from what I specified. Before, to get that behavior, you would have had to use carefully chosen values with units of bytes ('B') or sectors ('s') to obtain the same result, and with sectors, your usage would not be portable between devices with varying sector sizes. This change does not affect how parted handles suffixes like KB, MB, GB, etc."
  - "Note that as of parted-2.4, when you specify start and/or end values using IEC binary units like 'MiB', 'GiB', 'TiB', etc., parted treats those values as exact, and equivalent to the same number specified in bytes (i.e., with the 'B' suffix), in that it provides no 'helpful' range of sloppiness. Contrast that with a partition start request of '4GB', which may actually resolve to some sector up to 500MB before or after that point. Thus, when creating a partition, you should prefer to specify units of bytes ('B'), sectors ('s'), or IEC binary units like 'MiB', but not 'MB', 'GB', etc."
- On its Archive Project Request Form, the University of Oxford uses IEC prefixes: "The initial amount of data to be archived (MiB GiB TiB )"
- The IBM Style Guide permits IEC prefixes or "SI prefixes" if used consistently and explained to the user "Whether you choose to use IEC prefixes for powers of 2 and SI prefixes for powers of 10, or use SI prefixes for a dual purpose ... be consistent in your usage and explain to the user your adopted system."

=== 2012 ===
- June: Toshiba describes data transfer rates in units of MiB/s. In the same press release, SSD storage capacity is given in decimal gigabytes, accompanied by the footnote "One Gigabyte (GB) means 10^{9} = 1,000,000,000 bytes using powers of 10. A computer operating system, however, reports storage capacity using powers of 2 for the definition of 1 GB = 1,073,741,824 bytes and therefore shows less storage capacity"
- July: Ola BRUSET and Tor Øyvind VEDAL are granted a patent citing the binary unit KiHz to mean 1024 hertz
- The Minnesota Supercomputing Institute of the University of Minnesota uses IEC prefixes to describe its supercomputing facilities
  - "Itasca is an HP Linux cluster with 1,091 HP ProLiant BL280c G6 blade servers, each with two quad-core 2.8 GHz Intel Xeon X5560 'Nehalem EP' processors sharing 24 GiB of system memory, with a 40-gigabit QDR InfiniBand (IB) interconnect. In total, Itasca consists of 8,728 compute cores and 24 TiB of main memory."
  - "Cascade consists of a Dell R710 head/login node, 48 GiB of memory; eight Dell compute nodes, each with dual X5675 six-core 3.06 GHz processors and 96 GiB of main memory; and 32 Nvidia M2070 GPGPUs. A compute node is connected to four GPGPUs, each of which has 448 3.13 GHz cores and 5 GiB of memory. Each GPU is capable of 1.2 single-precision TFLOPS and 0.5 double-precision TFLOPs."
- Phidgets Inc describes PhidgetSBC3 as a "Single board computer running Debian 7.0 with 128 MiB DDR2 SDRAM, 1 GiB Flash, integrated 1018 and 6 USB 2.0 High Speed 480Mbits/s ports".
- IBM's Customer Information Center uses IEC prefixes to disambiguate
  - "To reduce the possibility of confusion, this information center represents data storage using both decimal and binary units. Data storage values are displayed using the following format:#### decimal unit (binary unit). By this example, the value 512 terabytes is displayed as: 512 TB (465.6 TiB)"

=== 2013 ===
- February: Toshiba distinguishes unambiguously between decimal and binary prefixes by means of footnotes. Hybrid drives MQ01ABD100H and MQ01ABD075H are described as having a buffer size of 32 MiB.
  - "1 MB (megabytes) = 1000000 bytes, 1 GB (gigabytes) = 1000000000 bytes, 1 TB (terabytes) = 1000000000000 bytes"
  - "KiB (kebibytes [sic]) = 1024 (2^{10} bytes), MiB (mebibytes) = 1048576 (2^{20}) bytes, GiB (gibibytes) = 1073741824 (2^{30}) bytes".
- March: Kevin Klughart uses the zebibyte (ZiB) and yobibyte (YiB) as units for maximum volume size
- PRACE Best Practice Guide uses IEC prefixes for net capacity (300 TiB) and throughput (2 GiB/s).
- Nicla Andersson, of Sweden's National Supercomputer Centre, Sweden, refers to the NSC's Triolith as having "42.75 TiB memory" and "75 TiB/s aggregate memory BW" and to a 2018 DARPA target of "32–64 PiB memory"
- August: Mitsuo Yokokawa, of Kobe University, describes the Japanese K Computer as having "1.27 (1.34) PiB" of memory.
- The official file server of the University of Stuttgart reports file sizes in gibibytes (GiB) and tebibytes (TiB).
- In their book IBM Virtualization Engine TS7700 with R3.0, Coyne et al. use IEC prefixes to distinguish them from decimal prefixes. Examples are
  - "Larger, 1.1 GB (1 GiB) internal buffer on Model E06/EU6, 536.9 MB (512 MiB) for Model E05, 134.2 MB (128 MiB) for Model J1A"
  - "Up to 160 Mibit/sec. native data rate for the Models E06 and EU6, four times faster than the model J1A at 40 Mibit/sec. (Up to 100 Mibit/sec. for the Model E05)"
- Maple 17 uses MiB and GiB as units of memory usage.
- November: The online computer dictionary FOLDOC defines the kilobyte as one thousand (1000) bytes, the megabyte as one million (1000^{2}) bytes, and the gigabyte as one billion (1000^{3}) bytes.

=== 2014 ===
- February: Rahul Bali writes
  - "the [Sequia (IBM)] contains in total 1,572,864 processor cores with 1.5 PiB memory"
  - "The total CPU plus coprocessor memory [of the Tianhe-2 (NUDT)] is 1,375 TiB."
- CDBurnerXP states disc sizes in mebibytes (MiB) and gibibytes (GiB), clarifying that "in Windows, if you see GB or MB it usually refers to GiB or MiB respectively".
- September: HP 3PAR StoreServ Storage best practices guide uses binary prefixes for storage and decimal prefixes for speed.

=== 2017 ===
- K Liao and co-authors approximate the year as 30 mebiseconds (30 Mis), or approximately 31.46 Ms, whereas a Julian year is approximately 31.56 Ms.

=== 2019 ===
- The BIPM publishes the 9th SI brochure, confirming the position from its 8th brochure (published in 2006), with the note
  "The SI prefixes refer strictly to powers of 10. They should not be used to indicate powers of 2 [...]"
- "The decimal SI prefixes are sometimes wrongly used in place of the IEC binary prefixes when reporting hard disk storage sizes, leading to confusion amongst customers as to what is being purchased"

== 2020s ==
=== 2020 ===
- A Californian court finds that, as the NIST specifies that prefixes such as "G" are decimal rather than binary, and that California law specifies that the NIST definitions of measure "shall govern ... transactions in this state", and because the vendor of a 64 GB flash drive with 64 billion bytes indicated on the packaging of the drive that 1 GB = 1000000000 bytes, they did not deceive consumers into believing that the drive had 64 × 1024 × 1024 × 1024 bytes.

=== 2021 ===
- Ainslie, Halvorsen and Robinson point out the parallel with the confusion between a one-third octave and a one-tenth decade in acoustics.
  "The near coincidence between ten octaves and three decades (2^{10} ≈ 10^{3}) is identical to the one that causes confusion in the computer industry by use of the term 'kilobyte' to mean 1024 B ... when the internationally accepted use of the prefix kilo requires it to mean 1000 B."

=== 2022 ===
- February: IEEE 1541 is amended to include the prefixes zebi and yobi.
- November: The additional decimal prefixes ronna for 1000^{9} and quetta for 1000^{10} are adopted by the International Bureau of Weights and Measures (BIPM). Binary counterparts to ronna and quetta were suggested in a consultation paper of the Consultative Committee for Units (CCU) for the International Committee for Weights and Measures as robi (Ri, 1024^{9}) and quebi (Qi, 1024^{10}).

=== 2023 ===
- August: "Almost everyone, including scientists and engineers, thinks that [the acceptance of an SI prefix with a binary meaning] is correct. On the other hand, the prefixes for binary multiples were already defined by the relevant standards approximately 23 years ago. This nonstandard notation confuses at the very least or can cause rather serious problems. Hence, all parties should immediately abandon this misconception and disseminate the correct information to everyone."

=== 2025 ===
- February: IEC 80000-13:2025 defines two new prefixes robi (symbol Ri) and quebi (Qi) for binary multiples.
- November: Use of MiHz to mean 1024^{2} Hz.
