= Computer Pioneer Award =

Award conferred by the IEEE Computer Society

IEEE Computer Society Computer Pioneer Award
- Awarded for: Outstanding contributions to the concepts and development of the computer field
- Country: USA
- First award: 1981
- Website: computer.org/awards

The Computer Pioneer Award was established in 1981 by the Board of Governors of the IEEE Computer Society to recognize and honor the vision of those people whose efforts resulted in the creation and continued vitality of the computer industry. The award is presented to outstanding individuals whose main contribution to the concepts and development of the computer field was made at least fifteen years earlier. The recognition is engraved on a silver medal specially struck for the Society.

This award has now been renamed to "Women of the ENIAC Computer Pioneer Award".

== Award types ==
The award has two types of recipients:

- Computer Pioneer Charter Recipients - At the inauguration of this award, the individuals who already meet the Computer Pioneer Award criteria and also have received IEEE Computer Society awards prior to 1981.
- Computer Pioneer Recipients - Awarded annually since 1981.

== Computer Pioneer Charter Recipients ==
- Howard H. Aiken - Large-Scale Automatic Computation
- Samuel N. Alexander - SEAC
- Gene M. Amdahl - Large-Scale Computer Architecture
- John W. Backus - FORTRAN
- Robert S. Barton - Language-Directed Architecture
- C. Gordon Bell - Computer Design
- Frederick P. Brooks, Jr. - Compatible Computer Family System/IBM 360
- Wesley A. Clark - First Personal Computer
- Fernando J. Corbato - Timesharing
- Seymour R. Cray - Scientific Computer Systems
- Edsger W. Dijkstra - Multiprogramming Control
- J. Presper Eckert - First All-Electronic Computer: ENIAC
- Jay W. Forrester - First Large-Scale Coincident Current Memory
- Herman H. Goldstine - Contributions to Early Computer Design
- Richard W. Hamming - Error-correcting code
- Jean A. Hoerni - Planar Semiconductor Manufacturing Process
- Grace M. Hopper - Automatic Programming
- Alston S. Householder - Numerical Methods
- David A. Huffman - Sequential Circuit Design
- Kenneth E. Iverson - APL
- Tom Kilburn - Paging Computer Design
- Donald E. Knuth - Science of Computer Algorithms
- Herman Lukoff - Early Electronic Computer Circuits
- John W. Mauchly - First All-Electronic Computer: ENIAC
- Gordon E. Moore - Integrated Circuit Production Technology
- Allen Newell - Contributions to Artificial Intelligence
- Robert N. Noyce - Integrated Circuit Production Technology
- Lawrence G. Roberts - Packet Switching
- George R. Stibitz - First Remote Computation
- Shmuel Winograd - Efficiency of Computational Algorithms
- Maurice V. Wilkes - Microprogramming
- Konrad Zuse - First Process Control Computer
- See external list of Computer Pioneer Charter Recipients

== Computer Pioneer Recipients ==
Source: IEEE Computer Society

Year	Recipient	Significant contribution
2025	Moshe Y. Vardi	For contributions to the development of logic as a unifying foundational framework and a tool for modeling computational systems.
2025	Gurindar S. Sohi	For contributions to the microarchitecture of instruction-level parallel processors and his impact on the computer architecture community.
2024	Fei Fei Li	For contributions to computer vision, especially the development of Imagenet.
2024	Leonard Kleinrock	For development of the mathematical theory of data networks, the technology underpinning the Internet.
2023	Daniel S. Bricklin	For creating VisiCalc, the progenitor of the modern spreadsheet.
2023	Scott Shenker	For pioneering contributions to scheduling and management of packet-switched networks, impacting the theory and practice of communication networks.
2022	Daphne Koller	For contributions to representation, inference, and learning in probabilistic models with applications to computational biology and human health.
2022	Christos Papadimitriou	For fundamental contributions to Computer Science, via the development of the theory of algorithms and complexity, and its application to the natural and social sciences.
2021	Peter J. Denning	For seminal contributions to virtual memory, the Internet infrastructure, and computing education.
2021	Moti Yung	For transformative innovations in "Trust in Computation;" specifically, coinventing "Malicious Cryptography", and pioneering contributions to "Distributed Cryptosystems".
2020	Demetri Terzopoulos	For a leading role in developing computer vision, computer graphics, and medical imaging through pioneering research that has helped unify these fields and has impacted related disciplines within and beyond computer science.
2020	Jack Dongarra	For leadership in the area of high-performance mathematical software.
2019	Laura Haas	For pioneering innovations in the architecture of federated databases and in the integration of data from multiple, heterogeneous sources.
2019	Jitendra Malik	For a leading role in developing Computer Vision into a thriving discipline through pioneering research, leadership, and mentorship.
2018	Barbara Liskov	for "pioneering data abstraction, polymorphism, and support for fault tolerance and distributed computing in the programming languages CLU and Argus." (source)
2018	Bjarne Stroustrup	For pioneering C++.
2018	Larry Page	For the creation of the Google search engine and leadership in creating ambitious products and research initiatives.
2018	Sergey Brin	For the creation of the Google search engine and leadership in creating ambitious products and research initiatives.
2016	E. Grady Booch	For pioneering work in Object Modeling that led to the creation of the Unified Modeling Language (UML).
2015	Michael J. Flynn	For more than 50 years of leadership including the creation of TCCA and SIGARCH.
2015	Peter M. Kogge	For developing algorithms for recurrence, development of the multi-core microprocessor chip and the formalization of methods for designing the control of a computer pipeline.
2014	Linus Torvalds	For pioneering development of the Linux kernel using the open-source approach.
2013	Edward Feigenbaum	For development of the basic principles and methods of knowledge-based systems and their practical applications.
2013	Stephen Furber	For pioneering work as a principal designer of the ARM 32-bit RISC microprocessor.
2012	Cleve Moler	For improving the quality of mathematical software, making it more accessible and creating MATLAB.
2011	David Kuck	For pioneering parallel architectures including the Illiac IV, the Burroughs BSP, and Cedar; and, for revolutionary parallel compiler technology including Parafrase and KAP Tools.
2009	Jean E. Sammet	For pioneering work and lifetime achievement as one of the first developers and researchers in programming languages.
2009	Lynn Conway	For contributions to superscalar architecture, including multiple-issue dynamic instruction scheduling, and for the innovation and widespread teaching of simplified VLSI design methods.
2008	Betty Jean Jeanings Bartik	Programmer including co-leading the first teams of ENIAC programmers, and pioneering work on BINAC and UNIVAC I
2008	Edward J. McCluskey	Design and synthesis of digital systems over five decades, including the first algorithm for logic synthesis (the Quine-McCluskey method)
2008	Carl A. Petri	Petri net theory (1962) and then parallel and distributed computing
2006	Mamoru Hosaka	Computing in Japan
2006	Arnold M. Spielberg	Real-time data acquisition and recording that significantly contributed to the definition of modern feedback and control processes
2004	Frances E. Allen	Theory and practice of compiler optimization
2003	Martin Richards	System software portability through the programming language BCPL widely influential and used in academia and industry for a variety of prominent system software
2002	Per Brinch Hansen	Operating systems and concurrent programming, exemplified by work on the RC 4000 multiprogramming system, monitors, and Concurrent Pascal
2002	Robert W. Bemer	ASCII, ASCII-alternate sets, and escape sequences
2001	Vernon Schatz	Electronic Funds Transfer which made possible computer to computer commercial transactions via the banking system
2001	William H. Bridge	Computer and communications technology in the GE DATANET-30
2000	Harold W. Lawson	Inventing the pointer variable and introducing this concept into PL/I
2000	Gennady Stolyarov	Minsk series computers' software, of the information systems' software
2000	Georgy Lopato	Belarus of the Minsk series computers' hardware, of the multicomputer complexes and of the RV family of mobile computers for heavy field conditions
1999	Herbert Freeman	SPEEDAC of Sperry Corporation, and computer graphics and image processing
1998	Irving John (Jack) Good	Field of computing as a Cryptologist and statistician during World War II at Bletchley Park, as an early worker and developer of the Colossus at Bletchley Park and on the University of Manchester Mark I, the world's first stored program computer
1997	Homer (Barney) Oldfield	Banking applications ERMA, and computer manufacturing
1997	Francis Elizabeth (Betty) Snyder-Holberton	Sort-merge generator for the Univac and compilation
1996	Angel Angelov	Computer science technologies in Bulgaria
1996	Richard F. Clippinger	Converted the ENIAC to a stored program at Aberdeen Proving Ground
1996	Edgar Frank Codd	Abstract model for database management
1996	Norbert Frištacký	Digital devices
1996	Victor M. Glushkov	Digital automation of computer architecture
1996	Jozef Gruska	Theory of computing and organizational activities
1996	Jiri Horejs	Informatics and computer science
1996	Lubomir Georgiev Iliev	Computing in Bulgaria; 1st Bulgarian computers; abstract mathematics and software
1996	Robert E. Kahn	TCP/IP protocols and the Internet program
1996	László Kalmár	1956 logical machine and the design of the MIR computer in Hungary
1996	Antoni Kiliński	First commercial computers and informatics (computer science) curriculum in Poland,
1996	László Kozma	1930 relay machines, and early computers in post-war Hungary
1996	Sergey A. Lebedev	Designed and constructed the first computer in the Soviet Union and founded the Soviet computer industry
1996	Alexey A. Lyaponov	Soviet cybernetics and programming
1996	Romuald W. Marczynski	Polish digital computers and computer architecture
1996	Grigore C. Moisil	Polyvalent logic switching circuits
1996	Ivan Plander	Computer hardware technology into Slovakia and the control computer
1996	Arnold Reitsakas	Estonia's computer age
1996	Antonín Svoboda	Computer research in Czechoslovakia and SAPO and EPOS computers
1995	Gerald Estrin	Early computers
1995	David Evans	Computer graphics
1995	Butler Lampson	Personal Computer
1995	Marvin Minsky	Artificial intelligence
1995	Kenneth Olsen	Minicomputers
1994	Gerrit A. Blaauw	IBM System/360 Series
1994	Harlan B. Mills	Structured Programming
1994	Dennis M. Ritchie	Unix
1994	Ken L. Thompson	Unix
1993	Erich Bloch	High speed computing
1993	Jack S. Kilby	Co-inventing the integrated circuit
1993	Willis H. Ware	Design of IAS and JOHNNIAC computers
1992	Stephen W. Dunwell	Project stretch
1992	Douglas C. Engelbart	Human computer interaction
1991	Bob O. Evans	Compatible computers
1991	Robert W. Floyd	Compilers
1991	Thomas E. Kurtz	BASIC
1990	Werner Buchholz	Computer architecture
1990	C.A.R. Hoare	Programming languages definitions
1989	John Cocke	Instruction pipelining and RISC concepts
1989	James A. Weidenhammer	High speed I/O mechanisms
1989	Ralph L. Palmer	IBM 604 electronic calculator
1989	Mina S. Rees	ONR Computer R&D development beginning in 1946
1989	Marshall C. Yovits	ONR Computer R&D development beginning in 1946
1989	F. Joachim Weyl	ONR Computer R&D development beginning in 1946
1989	Gordon D. Goldstein	ONR Computer R&D development beginning in 1946
1988	Friedrich L. Bauer	Computer stacks
1988	Marcian E. Hoff, Jr.	Microprocessor on a chip
1987	Robert R. Everett	Whirlwind
1987	Reynold B. Johnson	RAMAC
1987	Arthur L. Samuel	Adaptive non-numeric processing
1987	Niklaus E. Wirth	Pascal
1986	Cuthbert C. Hurd	Computing
1986	Peter Naur	Computer language development
1986	James H. Pomerene	IAS and Harvest computers
1986	Adriaan van Wijngaarden	ALGOL 68
1985	John G. Kemeny	BASIC
1985	John McCarthy	LISP and artificial intelligence
1985	Alan Perlis	Computer language translation
1985	Ivan Sutherland	Graphics Sketchpad
1985	David J. Wheeler	Assembly language programming
1985	Heinz Zemanek	Computer and computer languages for Mailüfterl
1984	John Vincent Atanasoff	Electronic computer with serial memory
1984	Jerrier A. Haddad	IBM 701
1984	Nicholas C. Metropolis	Solved atomic energy problems on ENIAC
1984	Nathaniel Rochester	Architecture of IBM 702 electronic data processing machines
1984	Willem L. van der Poel	Serial computer ZEBRA
1982	Harry D. Huskey	Parallel computer SWAC
1982	Arthur Burks	Electronic computer logic design
1981	Jeffrey Chuan Chu	Electronic computer logic design

== Nomination process ==
All members of the profession are invited to nominate a colleague who they consider most eligible to be considered for this award. The nomination deadline is 15 October of each year.

- Nomination process

== See also ==
- List of pioneers in computer science
- List of computer science awards
- List of computer-related awards
- List of awards named after people
