= Werner Buchholz =

German-American computer scientist (1922–2019)

- Born: 24 October 1922; Detmold, Germany
- Died: 11 July 2019 (aged 96); Poughkeepsie, New York, U.S.
- Parent(s): Julius and Elsa Buchholz
- Awards: IEEE Computer Pioneer Award (1990)

Werner Buchholz (24 October 1922 – 11 July 2019) was a German-American computer scientist. After growing up in Europe, Buchholz moved to Canada and then to the United States. He worked for International Business Machines (IBM) in New York. In June 1956, he coined the term "byte" for a unit of digital information. In 1990, he was recognized as a computer pioneer by the Institute of Electrical and Electronics Engineers.

== Biography ==
=== Early life ===
Werner Buchholz was born on 24 October 1922 in Detmold, Germany. His older brother, Carl Hellmut (Note: Sources differ in regard to the correct spelling of the name of Werner Buchholz' brother. German sources seem to agree on Carl Helmut, whilst some English sources state Carl Hellmut (which isn't a common spelling variant in German).) and he were the sons of the merchant Julius Buchholz and his wife, Elsa. Due to the growing antisemitism in Detmold in 1936, the family moved to Cologne. Werner was able to go to England in 1938 where he attended school, while Carl Hellmut emigrated to the United States.

Because of the threat of invasion in May 1940, Werner with other refugee students was interned by the British and later sent to Canada. With the help of the Jewish community in Toronto, he was released in 1941 and able to attend the University of Toronto. He completed his training as an electrical engineer in the United States at Caltech. His parents were murdered in 1942 (Julius) and 1944 (Elsa) in a concentration camp in Litzmannstadt (Łódź).

=== Career ===
Werner Buchholz was a member of the team at IBM that designed the IBM 701 and the IBM 7030 Stretch, IBM's first transistorized supercomputer. His work involved setting standards in the field of character encoding on computing systems. In 1956, he coined the term byte as a unit of digital information. A byte was an ordered collection of bits, which were the smallest amounts of data that a computer could process ("bite").

In 1990, Buchholz received the IEEE Computer Pioneer Award, awarded since 1981 to recognize and honor individuals whose effort resulted in the creation and vitality of the computer industry.

=== Personal life ===
He worked 40 years at IBM in Poughkeepsie, New York, where he participated in the development of the computer. His wife Anna died in 2007 and their son John in 1975. Buchholz died in July 2019 at the age of 96. He is survived by his son Sham Rang Singh Khalsa and two grandchildren.

== See also ==
- List of IBM products
- List of computer term etymologies
