= MIR-3 =

- Developer: Victor Glushkov / Institute of Cybernetics of the Academy of Sciences of Ukrainian SSR
- Released: 1970s
- CPU: @ 10^{5} - 10^{7} actions per second
- Memory: up to 10^{6} knocks
- Storage: Magnetic tapes and disks
- Display: TV
- Input: Keyboard
- Dimensions: Size of a regular desk
- Predecessor: MIR-2

MIR-3 (Russian: МИР-3) is a third-generation computer that was released in the 1970s in the Soviet Union. It collected all the achievements of microelectronics in the 1970s. The main task of the MIR-3 computer was to solve computational problems for engineers.

MIR-3 consisted of keyboard, TV (display), a means of reading magnetic tapes and disks, a processor. The size of MIR-3 has decreased. Now it was the size of a regular desk. True, the size was without the means of reading magnetic tapes and disks. The speed of the MIR-3 computer was 10^{5} (100,000) - 10^{7} (10,000,000) actions per second. The memory capacity was up to 10^{6} knocks. Essentially, the MIR-3 computer consisted of several computers. The microprocessor consists of several processors, each of which was responsible for the operation of a separate MIR-3 unit. For example, one for reading information from magnetic tapes and transferring information, the other for processing and calculations, the third for printing on the keyboard, and so on. The complex structure of MIR-3 required the creation of means for coordinating the work of individual computer parts. When creating the charter, the language Analitik-74 was used. Participation in the creation of computers MIR-3 hosted by the Academy of Sciences of the Ukrainian SSR, including Victor Glushkov.
