= MIR-2 =

- Developer: Victor Glushkov / Institute of Cybernetics of the Academy of Sciences of Ukrainian SSR
- Released: 1969; 57 years ago
- Media: Punched tape, magnetic card
- CPU: @ 12,000 op / s
- Memory: 8,000 13-bit symbols (12-μs circulation cycle)
- Display: Vector graphic display and electric typewriter (Soemtron))
- Input: Light pen
- Predecessor: MIR-1
- Successor: MIR-3

MIR-2 (Russian: МИР-2) is the version of the MIR computer developed by the Institute of Cybernetics of the Academy of Sciences of Ukrainian SSR under the guidance of Victor Glushkov. It was first produced in 1969.

== Overview ==
The speed of the MIR-2 machine is about 12,000 operations per second. The capacity of the random access memory (12-μs circulation cycle) is 8,000 13-bit symbols. The read-only memory has a capacity of about 1.6 million bits with a cycle of 4 μs, which is enough to store several tens of thousands of micro-commands. There is a buffer memory for output information with a volume of 4000 10-bit words. As external devices were used: input from punched tape, output to punched tape, electric typewriter Soemtron, magnetic card drive, vector graphic display with light pen.

As the input language in the MIR-2 machine, a special high-level language Analitik was used, which developed the concepts of the MIR-1 built-in programming language and additionally allowed the formulation of tasks with analytic transformations of formulas, allowing analytical expressions for derivatives and integrals.
