= Aircraft Radio Corporation =

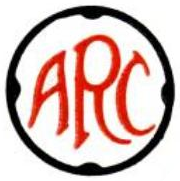
- Founded: 1924
- Headquarters: Boonton, New Jersey, United States
- Parent: Radio Frequency Laboratories (1924–1927); Cessna Aircraft Company (1959–1983); Sperry Corporation (1983–1986); Unisys Corporation (1986); Honeywell (1986–1987); Sigma Tek (1987–present)

Aircraft Radio Corporation (ARC) – not to be confused with Aeronautical Radio, Inc. (ARINC) – was a principal pioneer and major manufacturer of avionics for military and commercial aircraft, and later general aviation (light) aircraft, from the 1920s to the 1950s—subsequently acquired and rebranded by a succession of other companies, each of whom changed the official name, of the enterprise, while initially continuing ARC's primary function, staffing, facilities and product focus.

Consequently, many in the aviation industry—including many within its current and former parent companies—have unofficially referred to ARC, by its original name, as a continuing specific entity, regardless of its official names or owners at any point in time.

== History ==
=== Origins ===
ARC originated in 1924 in Boonton, New Jersey—a rural setting within sight of New York City—as the aircraft radio division of Radio Frequency Laboratories (RFL), which had started in 1922, in Boonton, as a radio-technology research organization, developing and holding numerous patents and employing such radio pioneers as Edward Weston, Lewis M. Hull and Stuart Ballantine. RFL developed technologies, but did not manufacture products. However, when it developed an aviation-radio division, in 1924, the division, ARC, soon outgrew its parent company, with the success of its aviation radios developed and manufactured in Boonton.

=== Independence ===
By 1927, Aircraft Radio Corporation (ARC) was a wholly owned subsidiary of Radio Frequency Laboratories, and was spun off as a separate company, producing navigation and communications radios for military, commercial and general aviation. ARC radios were considered mainstream, basic radios in their market segment, and were widely used. An airport was developed to accommodate the needs of the booming enterprise, on 116 acres near town.

In early 1929, an engineering conference at the Flying Field drew many people from the electronic instruments industry to celebrate the new ARC facility's opening and dedication, including a laboratory in Boonton, and a hangar at the Flying Field.

=== First "blind" flight ===
Pioneer aviator Jimmy Doolittle kept his plane at the ARC hangar, and teamed with ARC to accomplish the world's first "blind" landing – landing an airplane solely by reference to instruments, the first milestone in developing today's all-weather instrument flight. ARC developed the radio-beam and onboard radio receiver navigation equipment essential to the flight, the first radio instrument landing system.

The system they developed led to the creation of their "Model B"—an early radio navigation system for the airlines.

=== Military success ===
A history of U.S. Navy radio research and development describes how little ARC beat out competitors far larger in the electronics world:

The Bureau of Engineering decided to explore the frequency range 3000 to 4000 kHz for short-range fighter and spotting aircraft communication and sponsored NRL's [Naval Research Laboratory's] effort to provide suitable equipment (1926). The first such procured were the models MD (General Electric) and ME (Westinghouse) (1927-1929). These were followed by the [ARC] GF transmitter (5000 to 8000 kHz), accompanied by the [ARC] Model RU receiver. (1931-1933). The Model GF/RU equipment was the first to provide acceptable two-way, aircraft voice communication, feasible because of the availability of effective ignition-system shielding. The Model GF/RU (Aircraft Radio Corporation) was procured in large numbers and used extensively, and continued in use through World War II.

The GF/RU (Army designation SCR-183), a derivative of the civilian Model B, was chosen as America's standard military aircraft radio of the early 1930s.

By 1933, ARC-designed radios were being installed in the 1st fighter (aircraft) squadrons of the U.S. Army Air Corps and U.S. Navy.

By 1934, the company had its own airfield and airplane (a Berliner parasol monoplane, for experimentation.

The ARC-designed Navy ATA/ARA and SCR-274N communications radios were soon followed by the AN/ARC-5 communications radio system, which was a leading suite of Allied airborne electronics equipment during World War II.

=== Wartime ===
In the 1940s, ARC radios were everywhere in U.S. military aircraft. Lewis Hull served as ARC President.

The 1930s-era Model GF/RU remained valuable throughout World War II. An historical document of the Naval Research Laboratory reported that "very large numbers of these equipments were obtained and utilized before and during World War II, and they were used for a considerable time thereafter."

Among the company's most notable wartime programs was the development – jointly with the U.S. Army Signal Corps and U.S. Navy – of the SCR-274-N, an exceptionally useful HF voice-communication radio for aircraft, ranging up to frequencies of 20 megacycles – "the only powerful command set... available to American aviators at the beginning of the war" – particularly useful in the Pacific Theater, and valued at over US$2,400 at the time. ARC had delivered 2,700 of an ordered 2800 by December 1941, but the sudden wartime demand for tens of thousands of them forced the government to turn to a major manufacturer – Westinghouse Corporation – for the rest.

=== Postwar ===
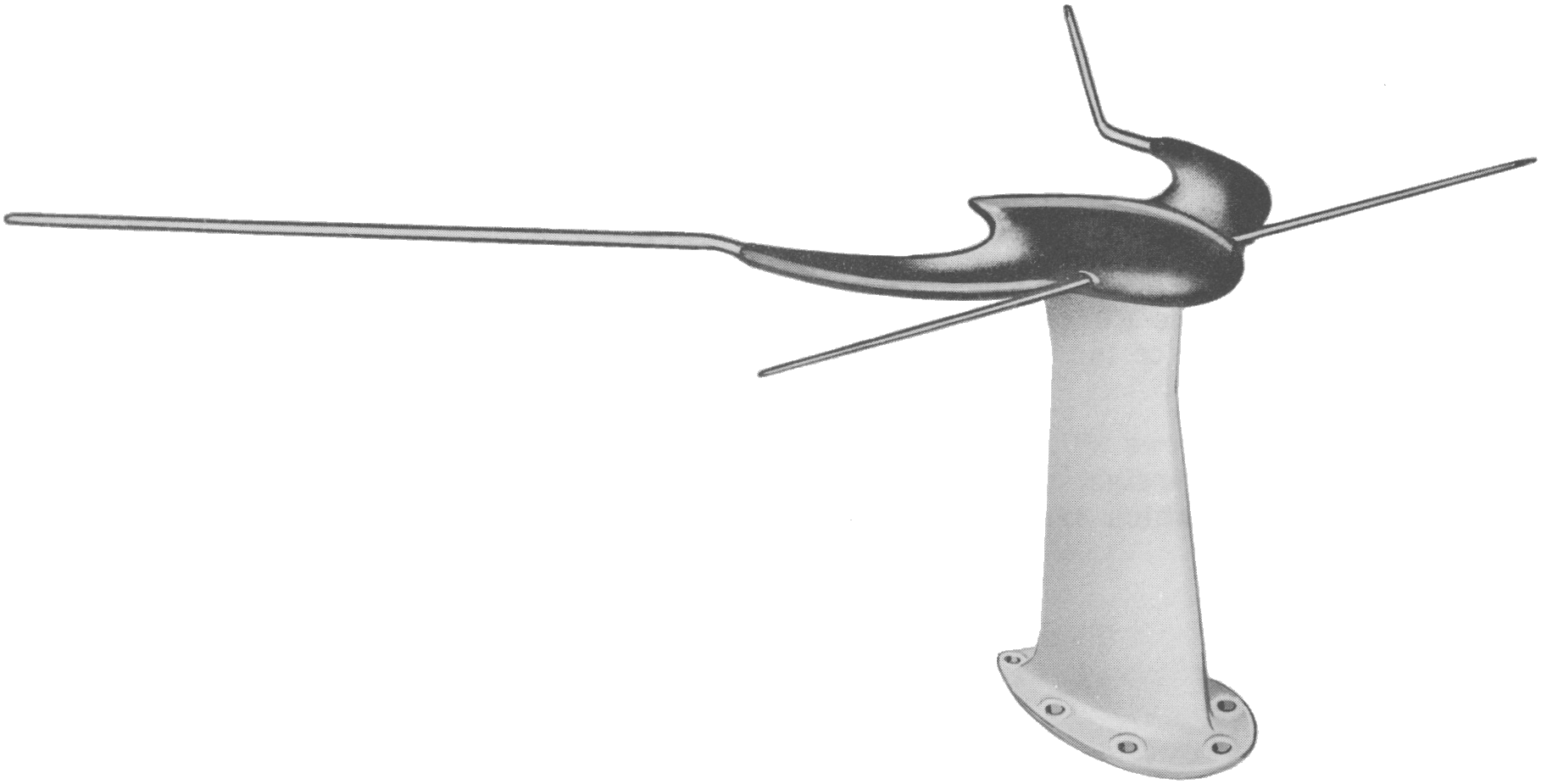
An A-13B antenna made by the company

The military avionics market evaporated after World War II, and ARC found itself outmaneuvered in commercial airline radios by Bendix Corp. and Collins. The postwar collapse of the light plane industry took their last market, and for the first time, ARC was losing money. The Korean War changed that—driving up demand for their military radios, but, again, when the war ended, ARC struggled. The situation was exacerbated by key engineers leaving to start their own enterprises.

An engagement with Laurence and David Rockefeller to work on a secret military radar system led to the Rockefeller family buying a controlling interest in ARC, and to their tampering with its independent status. Litton Industries got involved. Stock values fluctuated, burning some.

=== Cessna acquires ARC ===
In 1959, ARC was acquired by one of its principal customers, Cessna Aircraft Company, the world's highest-volume airplane manufacturer. Cessna, while retaining the name and quasi-independent status of Aircraft Radio Corporation, rebranded the company's products as "Cessna avionics," and the enterprise began a notorious decline in product quality, resulting in high product-failure rates and a terrible reputation in the aviation industry —which ARC nevertheless survived through its key position as the in-house supplier of the "factory standard" avionics for Cessna, world leader in light aircraft.

During this time, ARC's "Cessna" avionics line expanded and diversified radically to include most types of avionics for light planes, including NAV, COM, ADF, DME, and Marker beacon radios, and autopilots—mostly at the low end of the quality spectrum.

In the mid-1970s, during a period of exceptionally high productivity for Cessna, ARC was entangled in a legal battle with its employee's union, which resulted in a 1975 judgement favoring ARC. During the proceedings, the following findings emerged as public record in the published decision of the U.S. Court of Appeals for the Third Circuit:

"Aircraft Radio Company,* located at Boonton, New Jersey, is the second smallest of seven operating divisions of the Cessna Aircraft Company which has its headquarters at Wichita, Kansas. ARC is engaged in the manufacture, distribution and sale of aviation communication and navigational equipment. It supplies its products to Cessna as well as to other competitive firms. ARC is conducted as an independent business; sales and profits are accounted for separately, and its wage agreements are independently negotiated. In fiscal year 1972, ARC had total sales of $11,000,000 and in 1971, $6,700,000, which resulted in net losses for each of those years. By contrast, Cessna is much larger and more profitable. Its sales for 1972 were $248,000,000 which resulted in profits of $13,500,000."

(* Note that the original (1972) title of the case named ARC as "Aircraft Radio Corporation – implying a legally distinct entity, while the appeals court decision (1975), under that original case name, repeatedly refers to ARC in the body of the ruling as "Aircraft Radio Company," implying an identity less certainly distinct from its parent company, Cessna—a fact that changed during the litigation, apparently sometime after a September, 1973 letter from parent Cessna, of which the Court notes:

The company responded with a letter on September 25, 1973, asserting that the sales and profits cited by IUE were those of the Cessna Aircraft Company, Wichita, Kansas, and that ARC was independently responsible for all phases of its own business, including making a profit. On the following day, the company general manager delivered a prepared speech to the employees, explaining the distinction between ARC and Cessna and making available the [(separate)] financial reports of both concerns.)

The ARC identity issue, though—and the timing of ARC's names—is further confused by this 1978 statement in a judge's memorandum in a lawsuit over Cessna's marketing of its avionics:

The Cessna Aircraft Company (Cessna), is the largest manufacturer in the United States of general aviation aircraft. Through its Aircraft Radio and Control Division (ARCD), Cessna also manufactures and sells avionics equipment.
* * *
In 1959, Cessna obtained the stock, business, and assets of Aircraft Radio Corporation (ARC), an independent manufacturer of avionics. ARC was operated as a wholly owned subsidiary of Cessna until about September 30, 1968, at which time it was dissolved and replaced by ARCD.

Other sources, including a Cessna job ad in 1981, also indicate that Cessna, at one time, referred to ARC as "Aircraft Radio and Control - Cessna's avionics division."

In 1978, the ARC had an employee flying club at the company's private airfield adjacent to the factory.

At its peak, ARC employed around 3,500 workers. Among the senior personnel during the Cessna years, Floyd Piper served as chief engineer and chief systems engineer. He was followed in the mid 1970s by Paul Gralnick as Chief Engineer with Richard Foster assuming the helm as General Manager. In 1979 Gralnick was replaced by Virgil Davis as Chief Engineer. By 1980, a rejuvenated Quality Control organization led by Paul Weeks and new engineering Managers were hard at work enhancing the tarnished quality image that ARC had prior to that time. Engineering Departments were led in 1980 by Kermit Beseke - Radios, Bob Fuller - Navigation Products, Alan Metzger - Autopilots, and Ed Burt - Elecrtromechanical Displays. In November, 1981, John Ferrara was Manager of Advanced Development.

By 1982, the 110-acre Boonton plant was employing 900, with an estimated US$20 million in sales of aircraft and mobile communications systems, and navigation and guidance equipment.

=== Sperry / Unisys / Honeywell acquires ARC ===
In late 1983, Cessna finally sold its avionics subsidiary onto rival avionics maker (and industrial conglomerate) Sperry, who, in turn was acquired by Unisys, then Honeywell, Inc. Sperry decided to relocate ARC to Sperry's Phoenix, Arizona facility, ending 57 years of ARC's avionics development and production in Boonton. The ARC relationship didn't last long. On September 1, 1987, Honeywell handed ARC off to Sigma Tek, Inc.

=== Sigma Tek acquires ARC ===
On September 1, 1987, Sigma Tek, Inc. bought Aircraft Radio Corporation (ARC) from Honeywell, Inc. (When general aviation was at its most prosperous in the 1970s, ARC had been, by far, Sigma Tek's largest customer.) Through ARC, Sigma Tek now services and supports nearly all of the avionics and flight control systems for Cessna Aircraft.

=== ARC Avionics Corporation ===
ARC Avionics Corporation claims to be "successor to Aircraft Radio Corporation." Apparent press releases published in Aerospace and Defense Technology and in Avionics magazine describes it as "a wholly-owned business unit" owned by AirSpeed Engineering (ASE).

The ARC Avionics Corp. website indicates it is based in Kirkland and Everett, Washington (Seattle area). However, Aviation Maintenance Magazine lists the company as being based at a street address in Miami Springs, Florida, and the Aircraft Electronics Association also lists it (as a member "since 2001") in Miami Springs, at the same phone number, but as "Aircraft Radio & Avionics LLC," at a post office box.

That company says it primarily works in commercial and military aircraft technical services. with capabilities for test, repair, overhaul and calibration of navigation, communications and avionics instruments, as well as "hydraulic, mechanical, electro-mechanical" accessories and components for "commercial... military, corporate and general aviation, [both] fixed and rotary wing aircraft." Its press releases and reports, published in major industry magazines and news sites, indicate the company is active in fitting electronics to Boeing 737 jetliners.

According to their website, ARC Avionics has operated continuously since 1980, and has operated as an FAA-Certified Repair Station (FAA certificate LQ4R345M) and EASA Repair Station (EASA certificate 145.6521). Further, the site claims that ARC Avionics has FAA Parts Manufacturing Approval (PMA) certification to install and build STC kits, having "manufactured kits and parts" for various supplemental type certificates (STCs) held by ARC, as well as other STCs licensed under design approval agreements with FAA 8130-3 (EASA Form 1) approvals.
