= Stephen W. Dunwell =

American computer engineer

Stephen W Dunwell
- Born: April 3, 1913; Kalamazoo, Michigan, US
- Died: March 21, 1994 (aged 80)

Stephen Warner Dunwell (April 3, 1913 – March 21, 1994) was an American computer engineer, known best for his role leading the team developing the IBM 7030 Stretch supercomputer at IBM. He was honored with an IBM Fellow in 1966, a Computer Pioneer Award in 1992, and was named an ACM Fellow in 1994. He died of cancer.
