= Harry Franklin Vickers =

American inventor and Industrialist (1898–1977)

- Born: October 1, 1898; Red Lodge, Montana
- Died: January 12, 1977 (aged 78); New York City, New York
- Education: University of Southern California (Honorary Degree)
- Known for: Invention of the high pressure hydraulic vane pump and the first practical power steering system
- Spouse: Nell May Wilhite
- Awards: ASME Medal (1956); Numerous U.S. Patents
- Scientific career
- Fields: Mechanical Engineering
- Workplaces: Vickers, Inc. Sperry Corporation; Sperry Rand Corporation

Harry Franklin Vickers (October 1, 1898 – January 12, 1977) was an American inventor and industrialist. He grew up in Montana and southern California. He was called the "Father of Industrial Hydraulics" by the American Society of Mechanical Engineers, who gave him the Society's highest award, the ASME Medal, in 1956.

== Early life and influences ==
Vickers was always interested in machinery and mechanics and was a self-taught master machinist. He served in World War I in France with the US Army Signal Corps, where he learned about the first generations of electronics and radio. Returning to southern California after the war, he founded Vickers Manufacturing Co., later to be called Vickers Inc.

Initially his company was principally engaged in general mechanical and machining work. The famous author and sportsman Zane Grey once came to his shop to have a large salt water fishing reel repaired. Grey decided that the young Harry Vickers was a man with a future, and offered to arrange for him to be tutored in calculus and other engineering disciplines at night by professors from the University of Southern California.

== Inventions and business development ==
Vickers mechanical ability in combination with his electronic and engineering training formed the basis for his ability to invent, test and manufacture his early hydraulic innovations, which included the first hydraulic power steering system. He went on to invent numerous key components fundamental to the rapid growth of the fluid power industry, including his most famous innovation, the balanced vane pump. Vickers Inc. grew steadily, eventually moving its headquarters to Detroit to be closer to its major automotive and industrial customers.

== Merger with Sperry Corporation ==
With the advent of the depression, Vickers approached Frederick J. Fisher (one of the Fisher Brothers of Fisher Body, the principal supplier of automobile bodies to General Motors) to invest in his company to help it survive. They agreed that Vickers, Inc. would merge with the Sperry Corporation, (of which the Fisher Brothers had principal control) and operate as a subsidiary called Sperry Vickers, with Harry Vickers as president.

== Role in World War II and post-war economy ==
As the start of World War II approached, both Sperry Corp and Sperry Vickers became vital suppliers to the builders of virtually every type of weapon and support system, from aircraft and ships to tanks and transport equipment. At the end of World War II, Admiral Harold Raynsford Stark, who was Chief of Naval Operations at the start of the war, wrote that, in his view, Harry Vickers had done more than any other civilian to win the war.

Vickers many contributions to his country and global industry placed him in the company of many of the greatest individuals of his era. He was a close friend of Douglas MacArthur, who was the Chairman of the Board of Remington Rand Corporation when Sperry and Remington merged in the early 1950s, forming Sperry Rand. MacArthur continued in that role in the merged company.

== Executive roles ==
Vickers later assumed the Chairman's role subsequent to MacArthur's retirement. He served as the last president of Sperry Corporation between 1952 and 1955. He then served, in the successory title, as the first president of Sperry Rand Corporation from 1955 to 1965.

He also, during this time, served as the first CEO of Sperry Rand Corporation between 1955 and 1967. He then served as chairman of Sperry Rand Corporation between 1965 and 1967. When he retired in 1967, he was Chairman, President and CEO of the 56th largest company in the United States.

== Personal life ==
Vickers was an amateur radio operator, an active pilot, and an avid golfer, fisherman and hunter. He was married to the former Nell Wilhite, and they had two children: James (1924–1933) and Dawn (1927–1997).

== See also ==
"Modern Marvels: Hydraulics," The History Channel, released on DVD on May 12, 2004.
