= MIR (computer) =

MIR-1
- MIR-1
- Also known as: «Машина для Инженерных Расчётов» (Machine for Engineering Calculations)
- Developer: Victor Glushkov
- Released: 1968; 58 years ago
- CPU: @ 200-300 arithmetic operations per second on five-digit numbers
- Memory: 4096 12-bit words (access time 2.5 microseconds, memory cycle time 16 microseconds) (Magnetic core memory)
- Power: 1.5 kW (using 380V three-phase electric power)
- Weight: about 400 kg
- Successor: MIR-2

MIR (Russian:МИР) is a series of early Soviet transistorized minicomputers. It was developed from 1965 (MIR), 1968 (MIR-1) to 1969 (MIR-2). The development team was led by Victor Glushkov.

== Overview ==
MIR (МИР) stands for «Машина для Инженерных Расчётов» (Machine for Engineering Calculations) and means both "world" and "peace" in Russian. It was designed as a relatively small-scale computer for use in engineering and scientific applications. Among other innovations, it contained a hardware implementation of a high-level programming language capable of symbolic manipulations with fractions, polynomials, derivatives and integrals. Another innovative feature for that time was the user interface combining a keyboard with a monitor and light pen used for correcting texts and drawing on screen.

MIR-2
- Light pen with MIR-2
- Developer: Victor Glushkov
- Released: 1969; 57 years ago
- Predecessor: MIR-1

== Technical specifications ==
Technical specifications for MIR-1:

- memory unit: 4096 12-bit words of core memory (access time 2.5 microseconds, memory cycle time 16 microseconds)
- external storage: 8-track punched tape. Input device: paper tape reader FS-1501 (up to 1500 symbols/second). Output device: tape punch PL-80 (up to 80 characters per second)
- performance: 200-300 arithmetic operations per second on five-digit numbers
- power consumption: 1.5 kW (using 380V three-phase electric power)
- weight: about 400 kg

== See also ==
- List of Russian inventions
