= Norbert Frištacký =

Slovak computer scientist (1931–2006)

- Born: 8 November 1931; Púchov, Slovakia
- Died: 5 July 2006 (aged 84); Bratislava, Slovakia
- Education: Slovak University of Technology in Bratislava
- Occupation: Professor
- Scientific career
- Fields: Computer Science
- Workplaces: Slovak University of Technology in Bratislava

Norbert Frištacký (8 November 1931 – 5 July 2006) was a Slovak computer scientist and academic who specialized in logic gates and circuits.

== Biography ==
He was born on 8 November 1931 in Púchov, Slovakia. the son of Eduard and Anna Frištacký. He was married to Hilda Matejcikova and had one child with her. He died on 5 July 2006 in Bratislava, Slovakia.

== Education ==
His doctoral thesis was completed in 1963 at Slovak Technical University.

== Career ==
He served as a professor of computer engineering at the Slovak Technical University. He designed and initiated the current curriculum in computer engineering at the Slovak Technical University.

== Awards and honours ==
Frištacký received the Computer Pioneer Award in 1996.
