= Byte =

Unit of digital information, usually 8 bits

byte
- Unit system: Unit derived from bit
- Unit of: Digital information, data size
- Symbol: B, o (when 8 bits)

The byte is a unit of digital information that commonly consists of eight bits. Historically, the byte was the number of bits used to encode a single character of text in a computer and for this reason it is the smallest addressable unit of memory in many computer architectures. To disambiguate arbitrarily sized bytes from the common 8-bit definition, network protocol documents such as the Internet Protocol (RFC 791) refer to an 8-bit byte as an octet. Those bits in an octet are usually counted with numbering from 0 to 7 or 7 to 0 depending on the bit endianness.

The size of the byte has historically been hardware-dependent and no definitive standards existed that mandated the size. Sizes from 1 to 48 bits have been used. The six-bit character code was an often-used implementation in early encoding systems, and computers using six-bit and nine-bit bytes were common in the 1960s. These systems often had memory words of 12, 18, 24, 30, 36, 48, or 60 bits, corresponding to 2, 3, 4, 5, 6, 8, or 10 six-bit bytes, and persisted, in legacy systems, into the twenty-first century. In this era, bit groupings in the instruction stream were often referred to as syllables (Note: The term syllable was used for bytes containing instructions or constituents of instructions, not for data bytes.) or slab, before the term byte became common.

The modern de facto standard of eight bits, as documented in ISO/IEC 2382-1:1993, is a convenient power of two permitting the binary-encoded values 0 through 255 for one byte, as 2 to the power of 8 is 256. The international standard IEC 80000-13 codified this common meaning. Many types of applications use information representable in eight or fewer bits and processor designers commonly optimize for this usage. The popularity of major commercial computing architectures has aided in the ubiquitous acceptance of the 8-bit byte. Modern architectures typically use 32- or 64-bit words, built of four or eight bytes, respectively.

The unit symbol for the byte was designated as the upper-case letter B by the International Electrotechnical Commission (IEC) and Institute of Electrical and Electronics Engineers (IEEE). Internationally, the unit octet explicitly defines a sequence of eight bits, eliminating the potential ambiguity of the term "byte". The symbol for octet, 'o', also conveniently eliminates the ambiguity in the symbol 'B' between byte and bel.

== Etymology and history ==
The term byte was coined by Werner Buchholz in June 1956, (Note: Many sources erroneously indicate a birthday of the term byte in July 1956, but Werner Buchholz claimed that the term would have been coined in June 1956. In fact, the earliest document supporting this dates from 1956-06-11. Buchholz stated that the transition to 8-bit bytes was conceived in August 1956, but the earliest document found using this notion dates from September 1956.) during the early design phase for the IBM Stretch computer, which had addressing to the bit and variable field length (VFL) instructions with a byte size encoded in the instruction. It is a deliberate respelling of bite to avoid accidental mutation to bit. (Note: Some later machines, e.g., Burroughs B1700, CDC 3600, DEC PDP-6, DEC PDP-10 had the ability to operate on arbitrary bytes no larger than the word size.)

Another origin of byte for bit groups smaller than a computer's word size, and in particular groups of four bits, is on record by Louis G. Dooley, who claimed he coined the term while working with Jules Schwartz and Dick Beeler on an air defense system called SAGE at MIT Lincoln Laboratory in 1956 or 1957, which was jointly developed by Rand, MIT, and IBM. Later on, Schwartz's language JOVIAL actually used the term, but the author recalled vaguely that it was derived from the data processing system AN/FSQ-31.

Early computers used a variety of four-bit binary-coded decimal (BCD) representations and the six-bit codes for printable graphic patterns common in the U.S. Army (FIELDATA) and Navy. These representations included alphanumeric characters and special graphical symbols. These sets were expanded in 1963 to seven bits of coding, called the American Standard Code for Information Interchange (ASCII) as the Federal Information Processing Standard, which replaced the incompatible teleprinter codes in use by different branches of the U.S. government and universities during the 1960s. ASCII included the distinction of upper- and lowercase alphabets and a set of control characters to facilitate the transmission of written language as well as printing device functions, such as page advance and line feed, and the physical or logical control of data flow over the transmission media. During the early 1960s, while also active in ASCII standardization, IBM simultaneously introduced in its product line of System/360 the eight-bit Extended Binary Coded Decimal Interchange Code (EBCDIC), an expansion of their six-bit binary-coded decimal (BCDIC) representations (Note: There was more than one BCD code page.) used in earlier card punches. The prominence of the System/360 led to the ubiquitous adoption of the eight-bit storage size, while in detail the EBCDIC and ASCII encoding schemes are different.

In the early 1960s, AT&T introduced digital telephony on long-distance trunk lines. These used the eight-bit μ-law encoding. This large investment promised to reduce transmission costs for eight-bit data.

In Volume 1 of The Art of Computer Programming (first published in 1968), Donald Knuth uses byte in his hypothetical MIX computer to denote a unit which "contains an unspecified amount of information ... capable of holding at least 64 distinct values ... at most 100 distinct values. On a binary computer a byte must therefore be composed of six bits". He notes that "Since 1975 or so, the word byte has come to mean a sequence of precisely eight binary digits...When we speak of bytes in connection with MIX we shall confine ourselves to the former sense of the word, harking back to the days when bytes were not yet standardized."

The development of eight-bit microprocessors in the 1970s popularized this storage size. Microprocessors such as the Intel 8080, the direct predecessor of the 8086, could also perform a small number of operations on the four-bit pairs in a byte, such as the decimal-add-adjust (DAA) instruction. A four-bit quantity is often called a nibble, also nybble, which is conveniently represented by a single hexadecimal digit.

The term octet unambiguously specifies a size of eight bits. It is used extensively in protocol definitions.

Historically, the term octad or octade was used to denote eight bits as well at least in Western Europe; however, this usage is no longer common. The exact origin of the term is unclear, but it can be found in British, Dutch, and German sources of the 1960s and 1970s, and throughout the documentation of Philips mainframe computers.

== Unit symbol ==
The unit symbol for the byte is specified in IEC 80000-13, IEEE 1541 and the Metric Interchange Format as the upper-case character B.

In the International System of Quantities (ISQ), B is also the symbol of the bel, a unit of logarithmic power ratio named after Alexander Graham Bell, creating a conflict with the IEC specification. However, little danger of confusion exists, because the bel is a rarely used unit. It is used primarily in its decadic fraction, the decibel (dB), for signal strength and sound pressure level measurements, while a unit for one-tenth of a byte, the decibyte, and other fractions, are only used in derived units, such as transmission rates.

The lowercase letter o for octet is defined as the symbol for octet in IEC 80000-13 and is commonly used in languages such as French, and is also combined with metric prefixes for multiples, for example ko and Mo.

== Multiple-byte units ==
Multiple-byte units
Decimal				Binary					
Value		SI		Value		IEC		JEDEC	
1000	10^{3}	kB	kilobyte	1024	2^{10}	KiB	kibibyte	KB	kilobyte
1000^{2}	10^{6}	MB	megabyte	1024^{2}	2^{20}	MiB	mebibyte	MB	megabyte
1000^{3}	10^{9}	GB	gigabyte	1024^{3}	2^{30}	GiB	gibibyte	GB	gigabyte
1000^{4}	10^{12}	TB	terabyte	1024^{4}	2^{40}	TiB	tebibyte	TB	terabyte
1000^{5}	10^{15}	PB	petabyte	1024^{5}	2^{50}	PiB	pebibyte	—	
1000^{6}	10^{18}	EB	exabyte	1024^{6}	2^{60}	EiB	exbibyte	—	
1000^{7}	10^{21}	ZB	zettabyte	1024^{7}	2^{70}	ZiB	zebibyte	—	
1000^{8}	10^{24}	YB	yottabyte	1024^{8}	2^{80}	YiB	yobibyte	—	
1000^{9}	10^{27}	RB	ronnabyte	1024^{9}	2^{90}	RiB	robibyte	—	
1000^{10}	10^{30}	QB	quettabyte	1024^{10}	2^{100}	QiB	quebibyte	—	
Orders of magnitude of data

Unit multiples of the byte are defined in a metric system based on the powers of 10, following the International System of Units (SI), which defines, for example, the prefix kilo as 1000 (10^{3}), as well as a binary system based on powers of two. Historically, the binary system used the identical prefixes of the metric system, but quantified differently. The nomenclature of the latter system has led to confusion. Systems based on powers of 10 use standard SI prefixes (kilo, mega, giga, ...) and their corresponding symbols (k, M, G, ...). The modern binary system uses prefixes kibi, mebi, gibi, etc., and their corresponding symbols (Ki, Mi, Gi, …). (Note: The IEC prefix symbols are made by appending the letter "i" to the corresponding SI symbols, except for "Ki" which also has a change of initial case compared to the lowercase "k".) Historical usage for the binary system still uses the prefixes K, M, and G.

While the difference between the decimal and binary interpretations is relatively small for the kilobyte (about 2% smaller than the kibibyte), the systems deviate increasingly as units grow larger (the relative deviation grows by 2.4% for each three orders of magnitude). For example, a power-of-10-based terabyte is about 9% smaller than power-of-2-based tebibyte.

=== Decimal prefixes ===
Definition of prefixes using powers of 10—in which 1 kilobyte (symbol kB) is defined to equal 1,000 bytes—is recommended by the International Electrotechnical Commission (IEC). The IEC standard defines eight such multiples, up to 1 yottabyte (YB), equal to 1000^{8} bytes. The additional prefixes ronna- for 1000^{9} and quetta- for 1000^{10} were adopted by the International Bureau of Weights and Measures (BIPM) in 2022.

This definition is most commonly used for data-rate units in computer networks, internal bus, hard drive and flash media transfer speeds, ISP contracts, and for the capacities of most storage media, particularly hard drives and SSDs, flash-based storage, CDs, DVDs and Blu-rays. Operating systems that use this definition include Android (and derivatives), macOS, iOS, WatchOS, Ubuntu, and Debian, ChromeOS, HarmonyOS and the Gnome desktop environment. It is also consistent with the other uses of the SI prefixes in computing, such as CPU clock speeds or measures of performance.

The IBM System 360 and the related disk and tape systems set the byte at 8 bits and documented capacities in decimal units. The early 8-, 5 1/4- and 3 1/2-inch floppies gave capacities in multiples of 1024, using "KB" rather than the more accurate "KiB". The later, larger, 8-, 5 1/4- and 3 1/2-inch floppies gave capacities in a hybrid notation, i.e., multiples of 1024,000, using "KB" = 1024 B and "MB" = 1024,000 B.

Early 5 1/4-inch disks used decimal even though they used 128-byte and 256-byte sectors. Hard disks on PCs used mostly 256-byte and then 512-byte blocks before 4096-byte blocks became standard.

=== Binary prefixes ===
A system of units based on powers of 2 in which 1 kibibyte (KiB) is equal to 1,024 (i.e., 2^{10}) bytes was created by the IEC to solve the confusion over incorrect usage of SI prefixes. It is defined by international standard IEC 80000-13, which is supported by national and international standards bodies (BIPM, IEC, NIST). The IEC standard defines ten such multiples, up to 1 quebibyte (QiB), equal to 1024^{10} bytes. These unit symbols are rarely used in practice. Notable exceptions are KDE and applications based on the Qt toolkit but the KDE settings app allows switching to SI.

A historical convention of nomenclature for the same units, in which 1 kilobyte (KB) is equal to 1,024 bytes, 1 megabyte (MB) is equal to 1024^{2} bytes and 1 gigabyte (GB) is equal to 1024^{3} bytes is mentioned by a 1990s JEDEC standard which is used for RAM. Only the first three multiples (up to GB) are mentioned by the JEDEC standard, which makes no mention of TB and larger. These units can only be recognized through comparison using different software. Sometimes the capitalization of the K in KB can be an indicator. While confusing and incorrect, this convention is used by the Microsoft Windows operating system and random-access memory capacity, such as main memory and CPU cache size, and in marketing and billing by some telecommunication companies, such as Vodafone, AT&T, Orange and Telstra. For storage capacity, the historic convention was used by macOS and iOS through Mac OS X 10.5 Leopard and iOS 10, after which they switched to units based on powers of 10.

=== Parochial units ===
Various computer vendors have coined terms for data of various sizes, sometimes with different sizes for the same term even within a single vendor. These terms include double word, half word, long word, quad word, slab, superword and syllable. There are also informal terms. e.g., half byte and nybble for 4 bits, octal K for 1000_{8}.

=== History of the conflicting definitions ===
Percentage difference between decimal and binary interpretations of the unit prefixes grows with increasing storage size

When I see a disk advertised as having a capacity of one megabyte, what is this telling me? There are three plausible answers, and I wonder if anybody knows which one is correct ... Now this is not a really vital issue, as there is just under 5% difference between the smallest and largest alternatives. Nevertheless, it would [be] nice to know what the standard measure is, or if there is one.

— Allan D. Pratt of Small Computers in Libraries, 1982

Contemporary (Note: Through the 1970s there were machines with decimal architectures.) computer memory has a binary architecture making a definition of memory units based on powers of 2 most practical. The use of the metric prefix kilo for binary multiples arose as a convenience, because 1024 is approximately 1000. This definition was popular in early decades of personal computing, with products like the Tandon 5 1/4-inch DD floppy format (holding 368640 bytes) being advertised as "360 KB", following the 1024-byte convention. It was not universal, however. The Shugart SA-400 5 1/4-inch floppy disk held 109,375 bytes unformatted, and was advertised as "110 Kbyte", using the 1000 convention. Likewise, the 8-inch DEC RX01 floppy (1975) held 256256 bytes formatted, and was advertised as "256k". Some devices were advertised using a mixture of the two definitions: most notably, floppy disks advertised as "1.44 MB" have an actual capacity of 1440 KiB, the equivalent of 1.47 MB or 1.41 MiB.

In 1995, the International Union of Pure and Applied Chemistry's (IUPAC) Interdivisional Committee on Nomenclature and Symbols attempted to resolve this ambiguity by proposing a set of binary prefixes for the powers of 1024, including kibi (kilobinary), mebi (megabinary), and gibi (gigabinary).

In December 1998, the IEC addressed such multiple usages and definitions by adopting the IUPAC's proposed prefixes (kibi, mebi, gibi, etc.) to unambiguously denote powers of 1024. Thus one kibibyte (1 KiB) is equal to 1024 bytes, one mebibyte (1 MiB) is equal to 1024^{2} (1048576) bytes, and so on. In 1999, American computer scientist Donald Knuth suggested calling the kibibyte a "large kilobyte" (KKB).

The IEC adopted the IUPAC proposal and published the standard in January 1999. The IEC prefixes are part of the International System of Quantities (IEC 80000-13). The IEC further specified that the kilobyte should only be used to refer to 1000 bytes.

==== Lawsuits over definition ====
Lawsuits arising from alleged consumer confusion over the binary and decimal definitions of multiples of the byte have generally ended in favor of the manufacturers, with courts holding that the legal definition of gigabyte or GB is 1 GB = 1000000000 (10^{9}) bytes (the decimal definition), rather than the binary definition (2^{30}, i.e., 1073741824). Specifically, the United States District Court for the Northern District of California held that "the U.S. Congress has deemed the decimal definition of gigabyte to be the 'preferred' one for the purposes of 'U.S. trade and commerce' [...] The California Legislature has likewise adopted the decimal system for all 'transactions in this state.'"

Earlier lawsuits had ended in settlement with no court ruling on the question, such as a lawsuit against drive manufacturer Western Digital. Western Digital settled the challenge and added explicit disclaimers to products that the usable capacity may differ from the advertised capacity. Seagate was sued on similar grounds and also settled.

== Common uses ==
Many programming languages define the data type byte.

Java, .NET (C#, F#, VB.NET), Rust, D, Go, Swift, JavaScript, Python, Ruby all define and use 8-bit bytes capable of holding exactly 256 different values.

The C and C++ programming languages define byte as an "addressable unit of data storage large enough to hold any member of the basic character set of the execution environment" (clause 3.6 of the C standard). The C standard requires that the integral data type unsigned char must hold at least 256 different values, and is represented by at least eight bits (clause 5.2.4.2.1). Various implementations of C and C++ reserve 8, 9, 16, 32, or 36 bits for the storage of a byte. (Note: The actual number of bits in a particular implementation is documented as CHAR_BIT as implemented in the file limits.h.) In addition, the C and C++ standards require that there be no gaps between two bytes. This means every bit in memory is part of a byte. In C++17, a std::byte enumerated type was introduced with underlying representation as unsigned char, which is used to model a collection of bits and is not an arithmetic or character type. It is defined as an enum to prevent arithmetic use, but has no defined constants (instead being used like byte x{0xFF};).

However almost all modern software would not actually work if compiled with a byte size other than 8 bit. Further POSIX says "A byte is composed of a contiguous sequence of 8 bits." Today, non-8-bit bytes only find niche application like in DSPs.

In data transmission systems, the byte is used as a contiguous sequence of bits in a serial data stream, representing the smallest distinguished unit of data. For asynchronous communication a full transmission unit usually additionally includes a start bit, 1 or 2 stop bits, and possibly a parity bit, and thus its size may vary from seven to twelve bits for five to eight bits of actual data. For synchronous communication the error checking usually uses bytes at the end of a frame.

== See also ==
- Data
- Data hierarchy
- Nibble
- Octet (computing)
- Primitive data type
- Tryte
- Word (computer architecture)

== Notes ==
1. The term syllable was used for bytes containing instructions or constituents of instructions, not for data bytes.
2. Many sources erroneously indicate a birthday of the term byte in July 1956, but Werner Buchholz claimed that the term would have been coined in June 1956. In fact, the earliest document supporting this dates from 1956-06-11. Buchholz stated that the transition to 8-bit bytes was conceived in August 1956, but the earliest document found using this notion dates from September 1956.
3. Some later machines, e.g., Burroughs B1700, CDC 3600, DEC PDP-6, DEC PDP-10 had the ability to operate on arbitrary bytes no larger than the word size.
4. There was more than one BCD code page.
5. The IEC prefix symbols are made by appending the letter "i" to the corresponding SI symbols, except for "Ki" which also has a change of initial case compared to the lowercase "k".
6. Through the 1970s there were machines with decimal architectures.
7. The actual number of bits in a particular implementation is documented as CHAR_BIT as implemented in the file limits.h.
