= STRETCH Assembly Program =

STRETCH Assembly Program (STRAP) was the assembler for the IBM 7030 Stretch computer. The first version (STRAP-1) was a subset cross assembler that ran on the IBM 704, IBM 709, and IBM 7090 computers. The final version (STRAP-2) ran natively.
