= Ralph Lee Palmer =

Ralph Lee Palmer (19 June 1909 – 10 May 2005) was an American computer engineer and IBM Fellow.

Palmer studied electrical engineering at Union College in Schenectady, New York and graduated with a bachelor's degree in 1931. Palmer joined IBM in Endicott, New York in 1932. In 1939 he became manager of the development department of IBM Poughkeepsie. In World War II, he worked on the US Navy version of the bombe, an electromechanical decryption system for the German Enigma machine, which the Poles and then the British had developed.

After the war, he was part of the project team that designed the IBM 604, one of the first IBM machines to make widespread use of electronics rather than mechanical systems for calculations. He went on to be one of the leading consultants to Thomas J. Watson Sr. in the development of the IBM 701. In 1954, after successfully completing the 701, he became Director of the Engineering Department at IBM.

In 1963 he became an IBM Fellow. In 1983 he became a member of the National Academy of Engineering (NAE). In 1989 he received the Computer Pioneer Award for his work on the IBM 604.
