= Poltava National Technical University =

Public university in Poltava, Ukraine

Coordinates: 49.5761°N 34.5671°E

National University "Yuri Kondratyuk Poltava Polytechnic"
- Національний унівеситет "Полтавська політехніка імені Юрія Кондратюка" Інститут шляхетних дівчат,Полтава, Проспект Першотравневий, 24 061.jpg
- Motto: Ubi Concordia, Ibi Victoria
- Type: public
- Established: 1930
- Affiliations: Ministry of Education and Science of Ukraine
- Rector: Volodymyr Onyshchenko
- Students: ~10 000
- Location: Poltava, Ukraine
- Website: nupp.edu.ua
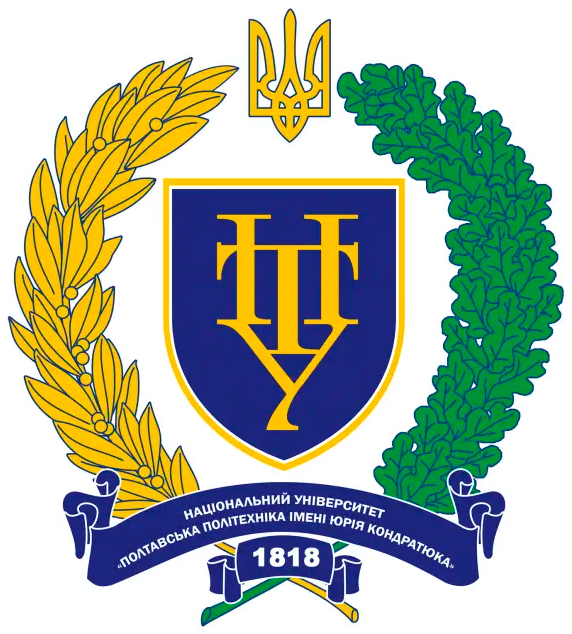

University rankings

Regional – Overall
- QS Emerging Europe and Central Asia: 351-400 (2022)

The National University "Poltava Polytechnic" (named after Yuri Kondratyuk, Ukrainian: Національний університет "Полтавська політехніка ім.Ю.Кондратюка") is a Ukrainian public university in Poltava (previously known as Poltava National Technical Yuri Kondratyuk University, PoltNTU).

== History ==
=== Early history ===
The Central Building of the university is a monument of architecture of the first hald of 19th century, built in the classical style. The building was architectured by Louis Charlemagne a part of the Empire-style ensemble of Poltava city center, and constructed in 1828–1832.

The Institute of Noble Maidens, founded on December 12, 1818, by Varvara Riepina in Poltava, became the first educational institution of closed type for noble girls in the Russian empire's principal town of a province. Over the hundred-year activity period, various famous Ukrainian, Russian and Czech culture activists had worked at the institute.

=== 20th century ===
In January, 1918, the Institute of Noble Maidens was evacuated to Vladikavkaz due to the October Revolution, where it started the process of founding and developing a municipal girls' school.

From 1918 to 1930, the Central Building of the Institute was used as a land management technical school, orphanage, gardening school and other establishments and organizations.

In the 1930s, the system of newly created higher education institutions was intended for satisfying the fast growing need of engineers for the great construction site that the whole USSR had become then, and Poltava became a union center of training agricultural construction engineers. Poltava Institute of Agricultural Construction was created in 1930. The faculty of agricultural construction was housed at the former building of the Institute of Noble Maidens on Petrshotravnevyi Avenue, 24. This building became the main one for the higher education institution.

At the beginning of military action at the Eastern Front of World War II, the teachers and students had to evacuate the institute to Oral, Kazakhstan. The graduates and teachers participated in the war. The students of the institute cared for the injured and stored fuel while continuing studying.

In October, 1942, they returned to Poltava, and had to rebuild it, as well as the building of the institute, destroyed during the war. For the first ten years after the war, the teachers and students worked on Shevchenko St, 8. While rebuilding the institute campus, the engineering team of the Institute of Agricultural Construction (renamed in 1961 to the Institute of Engineering and Construction) was growing and multiplying the facilities of the institution.

In 1954–1971, new faculties were opened, such as the faculty of industrial and civil construction, the architectural, sanitary and technical, general technology faculties, the faculty for extramural studies with evening school, the faculty of further education. In this period, other buildings of the institute were built, new dormitories for students constructed.

=== The period of independent Ukraine ===
In 1992, the institution was reformed from a construction institute training specialists in 6 specializations to a university working in 26 directions, such as economical, electromechanical, ecological, architectural, construction etc. Thanks to the fruitful work of teachers and professors of the institution, the conditions were created for it to receive the highest accreditation of IV level, and be renamed to a technical university according to the Decree of the Cabinet of Ministers of Ukraine of August 29, 1994. In accordance with the Decree of the President of Ukraine No. 302/2002 of March 27, 2002, the university received the status of "National University".

On June 21, 1997, to celebrate the hundredth anniversary of Yuri Kondratyuk's birthday, the university was given his name by the decree of the government.

On August 2, 2019, by the Decree of the Minister of Education and Science of Ukraine Liliia Hrynevych, Poltava National Technical Yuri Kondratyuk University was renamed to National University "Yuri Kondratyuk Poltava Polytechnic".

== Campuses and buildings ==
The University consists of the following buildings:

- Central studying building «Ц» (historical monument of architecture)
- Nine studying buildings: «Л», «П», «А», «Ф», «В», «У», «Д», «К», «Н»
- Laboratory facilities and modules
- The stadium and sports complex
- Campus of five dormitories for students and dispensary

== Institutes and faculties ==
=== Faculties ===
- Architectural
- Construction
- Electromechanical
- Oil-gas and nature management
- Finance and economics
- Management and business
- Information and telecommunication technologies and systems
- Humanitarian
- Centre of Postgraduate Education
- Preparation department for foreign students

=== Separate divisions ===
- Poltava Petroleum Exploration College
- Myrhorod State Art Industrial College

== See also ==
- Analitik – a computer programming language developed at the university
- List of universities in Ukraine
