= SAPO (computer) =

Czechoslovak computer

Artistic representation of the SAPO computer

The SAPO (short for Samočinný počítač, “automatic computer”) was the first Czechoslovak computer. It operated in the years 1957–1960 in Výzkumný ústav matematických strojů, part of the Czechoslovak Academy of Sciences. The computer was the first fault-tolerant computer – it had three parallel arithmetic logic units, which decided on the correct result by voting, an example of triple modular redundancy (if all three results were different, the operation was repeated).

SAPO was designed between 1950 and 1956 by a team led by Czechoslovak cybernetics pioneer Antonín Svoboda. Svoboda had experience from building in the United States, where he worked at MIT until 1946. It was an electromechanical design with 7,000 relays and 400 vacuum tubes, and a magnetic drum memory with capacity of 1024 32-bit words. Each instruction had 5 operands (addresses) – 2 for arithmetic operands, one for result and addresses of next instruction in case of positive and negative result. It operated on binary floating point numbers.

In 1960, after a spark from one of the relays ignited the greasing oil and the whole relay unit burnt down, it was decided not to repair the computer because of its obsolescence.

== See also ==
- EPOS (computer)
