= Text processing =

Creating or manipulating electronic text

In computing, the term text processing refers to the theory and practice of automating the creation or manipulation of electronic text. Text usually refers to all the alphanumeric characters specified on the keyboard of the person engaging the practice, but in general text means the abstraction layer immediately above the standard character encoding of the target text. The term processing refers to automated (or mechanized) processing, as opposed to the same manipulation done manually.

Text processing involves computer commands which invoke content, content changes, and cursor movement, for example to

- search and replace
- format
- generate a processed report of the content of, or
- filter a file or report of a text file.

The text processing of a regular expression is a virtual editing machine, having a primitive programming language that has named registers (identifiers), and named positions in the sequence of characters comprising the text. Using these, the "text processor" can, for example, mark a region of text, and then move it. The text processing of a utility is a filter program, or filter. These two mechanisms comprise text processing.

== Definition ==
Since the standardized markup such as ANSI escape codes are generally invisible to the editor, they comprise a set of transitory properties that become at times indistinguishable from word processing. But the definite distinctions from word processing are that text processing proper:

- represents "text processing utilities", not just "text editing" applications.
- is much more "the keyboard way", as opposed to "the mouse way" (e.g. drag and drop, cut and paste) of initiating an edit.
- is sequential access rather than random access in approach.
- operates directly at the presentation layer rather than indirectly at the application layer.
- works raw data that is standardized and works more openly rather than tending towards any proprietary methods.

In this way markup such as font and color are not really a distinguishing factor, because the character sequences that affect font and color are simply standard characters inserted automatically by a background text processing mode, made to work transparently by compliant text editors, yet becoming otherwise visible as text processing commands when that mode is not in effect. So text processing is defined most basically (but not entirely) around the visual characters (or graphemes) rather than the standard, yet invisible characters.

== History ==
The development of computer text processing started in earnest with Kleene's formalizing what is a regular language. Such regular expressions could then become a mini-program, complete with a compilation process, available to perform any edit, once that language was extended. Similarly, filters are extended by evolving particular options.

== Basic concepts ==
An editor essentially invokes an input stream and directs it to the text processing environment, which is either a command shell or a text editor. The resulting output is applicable to further text processing, the final result of which is comparable to a single application of an algorithm applied once by a more sophisticated and structured computer program.

Text processing is, unlike an algorithm, a manually administered sequence of simpler macros that are the pattern-action expressions and filtering mechanisms. In either case the programmer's intention is impressed indirectly upon a given set of textual characters in the act of text processing. The results of a text processing step are sometimes only hopeful, and the attempted mechanism is often subject to multiple drafts through visual feedback, until the regular expression or markup language details, or until the utility options, are fully mastered.

Text processing is concerned mostly with producing textual characters at the highest level of computing, where its activities are just below the practical uses of computing—the manual transmission of information.

Ultimately all computing is text processing, from the self-compiling textual characters of an assembler, through the automated programming language generated to handle a blob of graphical data, and finally to the metacharacters of regular expressions which groom existing text documents.

Text processing is its own automation.

=== Characters ===
Textual characters come in standardized character sets containing also control characters such as newline characters, which arrange text. Other types of control characters arrange the transmission, define the character sets, and perform other housekeeping tasks.

== See also ==
- Text editor
- List of Unix commands
