= László Kozma =

Hungarian engineer

László Kozma (Miskolc, Hungary, 28 November 1902 − Budapest, Hungary, 9 November 1983) was a Hungarian electrical engineer, designer of the first Hungarian digital computer (1957), and a full member of the Hungarian Academy of Sciences.

Due to the regulations of numerus clausus his application to the Budapest University of Technology was rejected in 1921, and he started to work as an electrician. Between 1925 and 1930 he studied at the Brno University of Technology, where he graduated as an electrical engineer in 1930, then was hired by the Antwerp office of the International Telephone & Telegraph company to design automated telephone switchboards and electromechanical computers. He moved back to Hungary in 1942, but in 1944 he was deported to the Mauthausen concentration camp. He returned in August 1945 in a very poor physical state, then worked for a Hungarian electrical company Standard Electrical Co. as designing engineer. He was arrested by the communist government in 1949, and sentenced to 15 years in the show trial Standard Gate. He was rehabilitated and released from prison in 1954 and taught as a professor at the Budapest University of Technology and Economics between 1955 and 1972.

His main researches were in the field of automatization of telephone technology, but he is more notable for the first Hungarian digital computer (called MESZ–1) which he designed and created between 1955 and 1957. He was a corresponding (1961), then a full member (1976) of the Hungarian Academy of Sciences.

== Some important publications ==
- The new digital computer of the Polytechnical University, Budapest. in: Periodica Polytechnica 1959. 321–343.
- Távbeszélő technika I–II. [Telecommunication technologies.] Budapest, 1966–1967, 366 + 184 p. (with Béla Frajka)
