= Analitik =

Programming language developed in the USSR

- Paradigm: A distinctive feature of the language are abstract data types, calculations in arbitrary algebras, and analytic transformations.
- Designed by: Victor Glushkov & Co
- Developer: Poltava National Technical University
- First appeared: January 1, 1968; 57 years ago
- Website: About Analitik

Major implementations
- MIR-2, MIR-3

Dialects
- Analitik-74, Analitik-2007, Analitik-2010

Influenced by
- ALMIR-65

Influenced
- Analitik-74, Analitik-2007, Analitik-2010

Analitik (Russian: Аналитик) is a programming language, developed in 1968 at the Institute of Cybernetics of the Academy of Sciences of the Ukrainian SSR in the USSR. It is a development on the ALMIR-65 language, keeping compatibility with it.

Distinctive features of the language are abstract data types, calculations in arbitrary algebras, and analytic transformations.

It was implemented on MIR-2 machines.

Later, a version of Analitik-74 was developed, implemented on MIR-3 machines.

At the moment, the language exists as a computer algebra system, Analitik-2010, which is being developed jointly by the Institute of Mathematical Machines and Systems of the National Academy of Sciences of Ukraine and the Poltava National Technical University.
