= SPEEDAC =

1953 computer

SPEEDAC, the SPErry Electronic Digital Automatic Computer, was an early digital computer built by Sperry Corporation in 1953.

It used 800 vacuum tubes and had magnetic drum storage of 4096 18-bit words.
