= Antonín Svoboda (computer scientist) =

American computer scientist

Antonín Svoboda (14 October 1907 – 18 May 1980) was a Czech computer scientist, mathematician, electrical engineer and researcher. He is credited with originating the design of fault-tolerant computer systems, and with the creation of SAPO, the first Czech computer design.

== Early life ==
Svoboda was born in Prague in 1907. Attending a series of schools, he studied at the College of Mechanical and Electrical Engineering of Czech Technical University in Prague (CTU), from where he graduated in 1931. In that same year, he traveled to England briefly to study physics, but returned to Czechoslovakia to conduct research and study under Václav Dolejšek, who made very significant discoveries in X-ray spectrography.

== Professional career ==
Svoboda and Dolejšek worked together on several projects, including X-rays and other astronomy-related aspects, but the rapidly rising specter of what was occurring in Germany, set against the backdrop of the economic collapse during his time, made pure science difficult to pursue. Even so, Svoboda took up positions at the CTU, including becoming an assistant professor of electrical engineering. He eventually gained his PhD in 1935, working on the concepts of mathematical models in the use and transmission of electricity and current.

== Wartime ==
In 1936, with war looming, Svoboda quit his positions in academia and joined the CDF and the Ministry of National Defense. Working there on a variety of projects, he was successful in vastly improving anti-aircraft artillery sights, capable of using predictive motion to "lead" a moving aircraft based on its direction and speed and adjusting the aim accordingly so that flak would hit. He worked on this project until the fall of Czechoslovakia in 1939.

At that time, alarmed that their research would fall into the hands of Nazi scientists, Svoboda and his research team fled to France, hoping to find a sympathetic ear and a place to work to fight the Germans however they could. Unfortunately, by the time Svoboda had gotten settled in, Germany's Wehrmacht had started the blitzkrieg, bypassing the Maginot Line and directly threatening Paris where he was working. During this time, Svoboda began work on what would eventually become his computer in later years, but his designs and drawings were all he had. Unwilling to leave such treasures to the Germans, he took them with him, but buried them in the construction of his bicycle.

== Escape from Europe ==
Svoboda's flight this time was far less organized, fleeing fast moving Panzer units. Just before France fell his pregnant wife Milada bore him twin sons while on the run. During the flight one of the babies died, and there was a great deal of harassment as they fled.

They managed to arrive in Marseille, where they attempted first to get out of France to Casablanca, and when that failed, managed to get to Lisbon. The ship's captain had no room for much cargo—with over two million refugees in Lisbon, space was at a premium. Svoboda had to throw his bicycle in which were hidden plans of anti-aircraft sight. They should be hidden not to fall in Nazi's hands.

== Living in the United States ==
Svoboda arrived in the United States in 1941, settling in New York City after almost a year of trials and tribulations. Svoboda participated in experiments in the Radiation Laboratory at MIT in Boston, and worked to develop a new auto-aiming targeting scope for warship anti-aircraft cannons. This was eventually developed fully as the Mark 56 Gun Fire Control System, which was mounted in the final stages of the war and was very effective in reducing the amount of damage by kamikaze airplane attacks, for which he was given a Naval Ordnance Development Award. In particular, he designed the linkage computer that was part of the Mk. 56 system. At the time, he was more proud of the design than the medal, but in later years it would come in handy.

Later, he conducted initial design work with other scientists such as John von Neumann, Vannevar Bush, and Claude Shannon on emerging computing elements, including ciphering.

== After the war ==
After the war, he spent some time helping to write computer documentation for the initial efforts in the US before returning to Prague. While initially he had wanted to stay in the US to participate in the development of computers, early frustrations and military controls of the project made him decide he would be better off trying to build up a Czechoslovak computer.

He returned to Prague in 1946, and became the department head at Prague's CTU of the Department of Mathematics. He attempted to get tenure but initially was rebuffed, and thus in 1950 he accepted an offer from Eduard Čech, the director of the Central Institute of Mathematical Studies, to come there and set up a new institute of what was called at the time "mathematical machinery".

In 1950, he launched the Academy of Science's Institute of Mathematical Machinery, and constructed the computer known as SAPO, the world's first fault-tolerant computer design. Based on unorthodox and untried elements and designs such as electromagnetic relays and drums, its architecture was quite advanced compared to other contemporary efforts such as ENIAC.

Svoboda went on to design several other follow-on computers, but after Czechoslovakia fell more fully under Soviet domination, began to feel constrained. Soviet officials limited his work and his access to the military computers he helped design, and eventually locked him out of his own office and told him that he would have to report to a political officer.

== Return to the United States ==
Svoboda left the unstable situation in Czechoslovakia in 1964, traveling first to Yugoslavia and from there to Greece, and then to the United States once more. Upon his arrival immigration officials were unmoved by his situation until he produced the medal given to him by the US Navy. Communication with certain authorities established his bona fides as a useful scientist, and he was quickly admitted to the country.

He worked at the University of California in Los Angeles as a professor of computer sciences, refining his theories on computer design, fault tolerance, mathematics and electrical engineering, and retired in 1977.

He died on 18 May 1980 in Portland, Oregon.

In 1999, the president of the Czech Republic Václav Havel awarded him the Medal of Merit, 1st degree, in memoriam.

== Impact ==
Svoboda was one of the most influential scientists in the 20th century. His designs and influence can be felt in everything from the computer design of the Apollo program to the theory behind what became the Phalanx CIWS, from early work on computer modeling to innovative combinations of electrical engineering with logic design to make fault-tolerant computers.

Svoboda's resistance to both Nazi Germany and, later, the USSR was a reason cited by many fleeing scientists during the 1960s from Czechoslovakia, who said he gave them the courage to dissent. His influence on computer technology is no less profound, as he was the author of one of the first books on computer science and many of the basic axioms developed in its theory were worked on by him along with many other scientists.

Among his publications is the volume "Computing Mechanisms and Linkages", part of the M.I.T. Radiation Laboratory series; it describes advanced procedures for optimizing linkage-type mechanical analog computing mechanisms, no doubt learned from when he designed such a computer for the U.S. Navy's Mk. 56 G.F.C.S.

== See also ==
- Svoboda's contact bones
- Svoboda's contact grids
- Svoboda's triadic map
