= 43,112,609 =

43112609
- List of numbers; Integers; ← 10^{0} 10^{1} 10^{2} 10^{3} 10^{4} 10^{5} 10^{6} 10^{7} 10^{8} 10^{9} 10^{10} 10^{11} 10^{12} 10^{13}
- Cardinal: forty-three million one hundred twelve thousand six hundred nine
- Ordinal: 43112609th (forty-three million one hundred twelve thousand six hundred ninth)
- Factorization: prime
- Greek numeral: $\stackrel{\delta\tau\iota\alpha}{\Mu}$͵βχθ´
- Roman numeral: N/A, n/a
- Binary: 10100100011101100010100001_{2}
- Ternary: 10000010100101022_{3}
- Senary: 4140015225_{6}
- Octal: 244354241_{8}
- Duodecimal: 12531515_{12}
- Hexadecimal: 291D8A1_{16}

43,112,609 (forty-three million, one hundred twelve thousand, six hundred nine) is the natural number following 43,112,608 and preceding 43,112,610.

== In mathematics ==
43,112,609 is a prime number. Moreover, it is the exponent of the 47th Mersenne prime, equal to M_{43,112,609} = 2^{43,112,609} − 1, a prime number with 12,978,189 decimal digits. It was discovered on August 23, 2008 by Edson Smith, a volunteer of the Great Internet Mersenne Prime Search. The 45th Mersenne prime, M_{37,156,667} = 2^{37,156,667} − 1, was discovered two weeks later on September 6, 2008, marking the shortest chronological gap between discoveries of Mersenne primes since the formation of the online collaborative project in 1996. It was the first time since 1963 that two Mersenne primes were discovered less than 30 days apart from each other. Less than a year later, on June 4, 2009, the 46th Mersenne prime, M_{42,643,801} = 2^{42,643,801} − 1, was discovered by Odd Magnar Strindmo, a GIMPS participant from Norway. The result for this prime was first reported to the server in April 2009, but due to a bug, remained unnoticed for nearly two months. Having 12,837,064 decimal digits, it is only 141,125 digits, or 1.09%, shorter than M_{43,112,609}. These two Mersenne primes hold the record for the ones with the smallest ratio between their exponents.

43,112,609 is the degree of four of the seven largest primitive binary trinomials over GF(2) found in 2016. and were the four largest in 2011.

43,112,609 is a Sophie Germain prime, the largest of only eight known Mersenne prime indexes to have this property.

43,112,609 is not a Gaussian prime, the largest of only 28 known Mersenne prime indexes to have this property.
