= 294,001 =

← 294000	294001	294002 →
- List of numbers; Integers; ← 10^{0} 10^{1} 10^{2} 10^{3} 10^{4} 10^{5} 10^{6} 10^{7} 10^{8} 10^{9} 10^{10} 10^{11} 10^{12} 10^{13}
- Cardinal: two hundred ninety-four thousand one
- Ordinal: 294001st (two hundred ninety-four thousand first)
- Factorization: prime
- Divisors: 1, 294001
- Greek numeral: $\stackrel{\kappa\theta}{\Mu}$͵δα´
- Roman numeral: C̅C̅X̅C̅I̅V̅I, c̅c̅x̅c̅i̅v̅i
- Binary: 1000111110001110001_{2}
- Ternary: 112221021221_{3}
- Senary: 10145041_{6}
- Octal: 1076161_{8}
- Duodecimal: 122181_{12}
- Hexadecimal: 47C71_{16}

294,001 (two hundred ninety-four thousand [and] one) is the natural number following 294,000 and preceding 294,002.

== In mathematics ==
294,001 has only two divisors, meaning that it is the 25532nd prime number. It is also a twin prime with 293,999.

=== Delicate Prime ===
294,001 is most notable for being a delicate prime in base 10, (Note: Also known as a weakly prime) which is also the first one. Since changing the number 1 in 294,001 to 7, the resulting number is divisible by 7; changing it to a 9, it becomes divisible by 3, all which are composite.

For every $d \in \{ 0,1,...,9 \}$, each of the numbers $d94001, 2d4001, 29d001, 294d01, 2940d1,$ and $29400d$, is either equal to 294001 or composite.
