= 509,203 =

| ← 509202 | 509203 | 509204 → |
- List of numbers; Integers; ← 10^{0} 10^{1} 10^{2} 10^{3} 10^{4} 10^{5} 10^{6} 10^{7} 10^{8} 10^{9} 10^{10} 10^{11} 10^{12} 10^{13}
- Cardinal: five hundred nine thousand two hundred three
- Ordinal: 509203rd (five hundred nine thousand two hundred third)
- Factorization: prime
- Divisors: 1, 509203
- Greek numeral: $\stackrel{\nu}{\Mu}$͵θσγ´
- Roman numeral: D̅I̅X̅CCIII, d̅i̅x̅cciii
- Binary: 1111100010100010011_{2}
- Ternary: 221212111101_{3}
- Senary: 14525231_{6}
- Octal: 1742423_{8}
- Duodecimal: 206817_{12}
- Hexadecimal: 7C513_{16}

509203 (five hundred [and] nine thousand two hundred [and] three) is the natural number following 509202 and preceding 509204.

== In mathematics ==
509203 is the 42228th prime number, and an deficient number. It is conjectured to be the smallest odd number not of the form $2^n+p$ with positive or negative prime.

=== Reisel number ===
Unsolved problem in mathematics
Is 509,203 the smallest Riesel number?
More unsolved problems in mathematics

509203 is most notable for being a Riesel number, specifically the smallest known one, but whether it is the smallest Riesel number, it is still unproven, since there is a debate on proving or disproving whether that $k = 509203$ is the smallest Riesel number. This is known as the Riesel problem, or Riesel conjecture.

In 1956, a Swedish mathematician named Hans Riesel showed that there are an infinite number of positive odd integer k's such that $k \times 2^n-1$ is composite (not prime) for every integer $n>=1$, and showed that $k = 509203$ was such one.

To check if there are $k < 509203$, the Riesel Sieve project (analogous to Seventeen or Bust for Sierpiński numbers) started with 101 candidates k. As of December 2022, 57 of these k had been eliminated by Riesel Sieve, PrimeGrid, or outside persons. The remaining 41 values of k that have yielded only composite numbers for all values of n so far tested are:

23669, 31859, 38473, 46663, 67117, 74699, 81041, 121889, 129007, 143047, 161669, 206231, 215443, 226153, 234343, 245561, 250027, 315929, 319511, 324011, 325123, 327671, 336839, 342847, 344759, 362609, 363343, 364903, 365159, 368411, 371893, 384539, 386801, 397027, 409753, 444637, 470173, 474491, 477583, 485557, 494743
