= 123,456 =

← 123455	123456	123457 →
- List of numbers; Integers; ← 10^{0} 10^{1} 10^{2} 10^{3} 10^{4} 10^{5} 10^{6} 10^{7} 10^{8} 10^{9} 10^{10} 10^{11} 10^{12} 10^{13}
- Cardinal: one hundred twenty-three thousand four hundred fifty-six
- Ordinal: 123456th (one hundred twenty-three thousand four hundred fifty-sixth)
- Factorization: 2^{6} × 3 × 643
- Divisors: 1, 2, 3, 4, 6, 8, 12, 16, 24, 32, 48, 64, 96, 192, 643, 1286, 1929, 2572, 3858, 5144, 7716, 10288, 15432, 20576, 30864, 41152, 61728, 123456
- Greek numeral: $\stackrel{\iota\beta}{\Mu}$͵γυνϚ´
- Roman numeral: C̅X̅X̅MMMCDLVI, c̅x̅x̅mmmcdlvi
- Binary: 11110001001000000_{2}
- Ternary: 20021100110_{3}
- Senary: 2351320_{6}
- Octal: 361100_{8}
- Duodecimal: 5B540_{12}
- Hexadecimal: 1E240_{16}

123,456 (one hundred twenty-three thousand four hundred [and] fifty six) is the natural number following 123,455 and preceding 123,457.

It has an increasing digit pattern. It is made up of the first 6 positive Arabic numerals.

== In mathematics ==
123,456 is an even composite number.

The sum of the base-ten digits of 123,456 forms the sixth triangular number, which is 21. 123,456 is more specifically the sixth member of the "Triangle of the gods" sequence, obtained by concatenating decimal representations of positive integers.

If multiplied by 9 and with 7 added, the result will resemble a repunit. This is part of a number pattern:

1 × 9 + 2 = 11
12 × 9 + 3 = 111
123 × 9 + 4 = 1111
1234 × 9 + 5 = 11111
12345 × 9 + 6 = 111111
123456 × 9 + 7 = 1111111
 etc.

== As a password ==
"123456" is the most commonly used password as of 2026 according to NordPass. It ranks first in seven of the eight annual editions of the company's report.

== In other fields ==
⠿o

Braille pattern dots-123456
- In Unicode: U+283F ⠿ BRAILLE PATTERN DOTS-123456

- The Braille pattern dots-123456 is a 6-dot braille cell with all six dots raised, or an 8-dot braille cell with both dots in the top three rows raised.

== See also ==
- 1234 (number)
