= 131,072 =

← 131071	131072	131073 →
- List of numbers; Integers; ← 10^{0} 10^{1} 10^{2} 10^{3} 10^{4} 10^{5} 10^{6} 10^{7} 10^{8} 10^{9} 10^{10} 10^{11} 10^{12} 10^{13}
- Cardinal: one hundred thirty-one thousand seventy-two
- Ordinal: 131072nd (one hundred thirty-one thousand seventy-second)
- Factorization: 2^{17}
- Divisors: 1, 2, 4, 8, 16, 32, 64, 128, 256, 512, 1024, 2048, 4096, 8192, 16384, 32768, 65536, 131072
- Greek numeral: $\stackrel{\iota\gamma}{\Mu}$͵αοβ´
- Roman numeral: C̅X̅X̅X̅MLXXII, c̅x̅x̅x̅mlxxii
- Binary: 100000000000000000_{2}
- Ternary: 20122210112_{3}
- Senary: 2450452_{6}
- Octal: 400000_{8}
- Duodecimal: 63A28_{12}
- Hexadecimal: 20000_{16}

131072 is the natural number following 131071 and preceding 131073. 131072 is a power of two, specifically $2^{17}$. The preceding power of two is 65536; the following is 262144.

== In mathematics ==
- 131072 is a regular number.
- It is the number that are the sum of 2 nonzero 8th powers.
- When expressed using Knuth's up-arrow notation, 131072 is $2\uparrow 17$.
- 131,072 is the largest determinant of a real {0,1}-matrix of order 15.

== In computing ==
- 131,072 bytes are equal to 128 Kilobytes (KB).
- 131072 is the highest possible single tile a player can achieve in 2048.
- 131072 is also the number that Salesforce has a default character limit when emailing from the "Case Feed" or from the "Case Publisher".
- On 21 June 1948, Manchester Baby's "The Baby" would successfully execute its first program to find the highest proper factor of the number 2¹⁸ in 52 minutes, which was 131072.
