= 144,000 =

| ← 143999 | 144000 | 144001 → |
- List of numbers; Integers; ← 10^{0} 10^{1} 10^{2} 10^{3} 10^{4} 10^{5} 10^{6} 10^{7} 10^{8} 10^{9} 10^{10} 10^{11} 10^{12} 10^{13}
- Cardinal: one hundred forty-four thousand
- Ordinal: 144000th (one hundred forty-four thousandth)
- Factorization: 2^{7} × 3^{2} × 5^{3}
- Greek numeral: $\stackrel{\iota\delta}{\Mu}$͵δ´
- Roman numeral: C̅X̅L̅I̅V̅ or C̅X̅L̅MMMM
- Binary: 100011001010000000_{2}
- Ternary: 21022112100_{3}
- Senary: 3030400_{6}
- Octal: 431200_{8}
- Duodecimal: 6B400_{12}
- Hexadecimal: 23280_{16}

144,000 is a natural number following 143999 and preceding 144001. It has significance in Christianity and Islam.

== Mathematics ==
144,000 is a composite number, a regular number, and a member of the sequence $a(n) = (11*n+1)*(11*n+10)$.

== Religion ==
=== Christianity ===
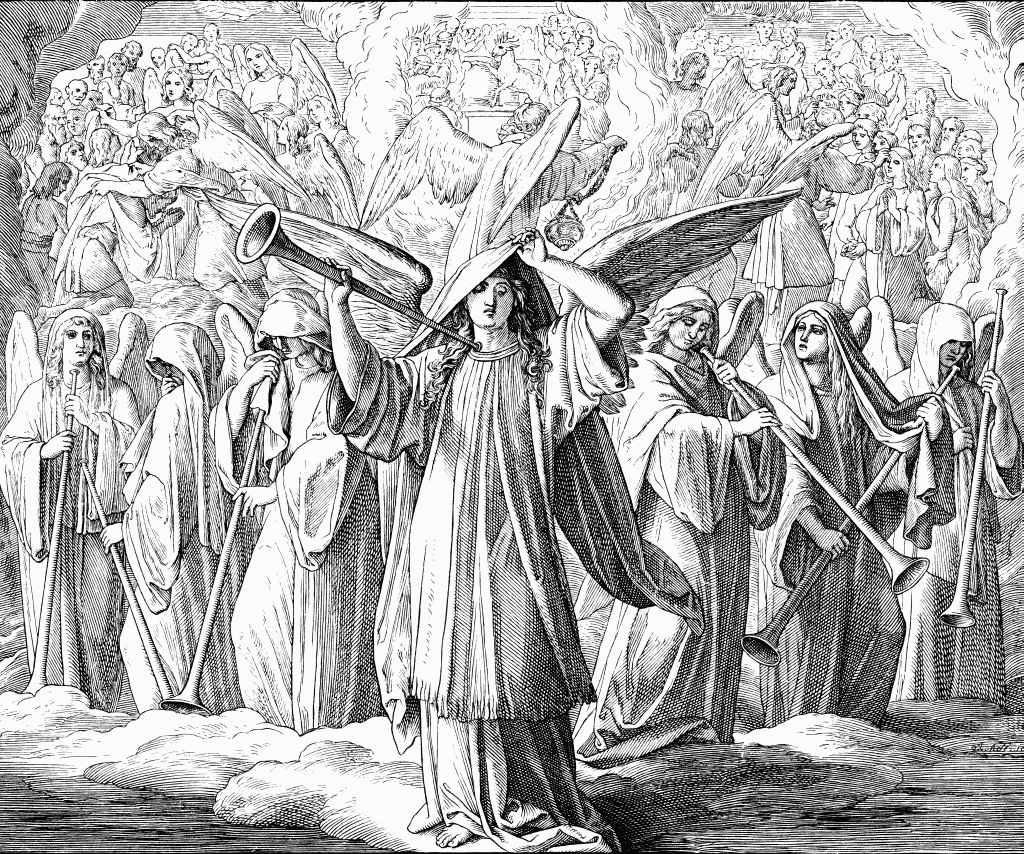
144,000 with Trumpets, 1860 woodcut by Julius Schnorr von Karolsfeld

==== Book of Revelation ====
The number 144,000 appears three times in the Book of Revelation:

- Revelation 7:3–8:

saying: "Do not harm the earth or the sea or the trees, until we have sealed the servants of God on their foreheads."
And I heard the number of the sealed, 144,000, sealed from every tribe of the sons of Israel:
12,000 from the tribe of Judah were sealed,
12,000 from the tribe of Reuben,
12,000 from the tribe of Gad,
12,000 from the tribe of Asher,
12,000 from the tribe of Naphtali,
12,000 from the tribe of Manasseh,
12,000 from the tribe of Simeon,
12,000 from the tribe of Levi,
12,000 from the tribe of Issachar,
12,000 from the tribe of Zebulun,
12,000 from the tribe of Joseph,
12,000 from the tribe of Benjamin were sealed.

- Revelation 14:1:

Then I looked, and behold, on Mount Zion stood the Lamb, and with him 144,000 who had his name and his Father's name written on their foreheads.

- Revelation 14:3–5:

and they were singing a new song before the throne and before the four living creatures and before the elders. No one could learn that song except the 144,000 who had been redeemed from the earth. It is these who have not defiled themselves with women, for they are virgins. It is these who follow the Lamb wherever he goes. These have been redeemed from mankind as firstfruits for God and the Lamb, and in their mouth no lie was found, for they are blameless.

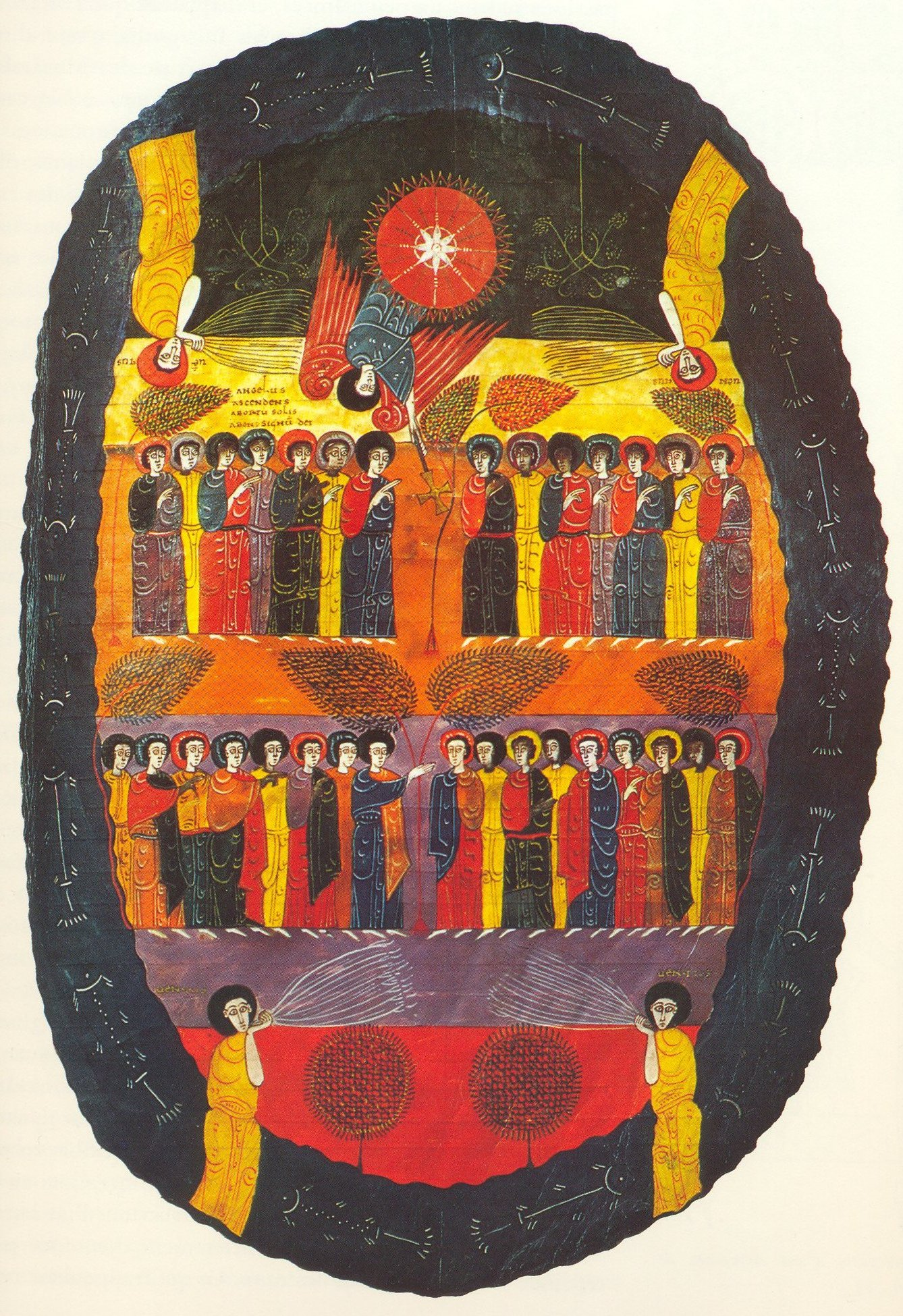
Page from an illuminated manuscript painted by an unknown artist, depicting the 144,000 from Revelation 7, from a copy of the Commentary on the Apocalypse by Saint Beatus of Liébana

The numbers 12,000 and 144,000 are variously interpreted in traditional Christianity. Some, taking the numbers in Revelation to be symbolic, believe it represents all of God's people throughout history in the heavenly Church. One suggestion is that the number comes from 12, a symbol for totality, which is squared and multiplied by one thousand for more emphasis. Others insist the numbers 12,000 and 144,000 are literal numbers and represent either descendants of Jacob (also called Israel in the Bible) or others to whom God has given a superior destiny with a distinct role at the time of the end of the world.

One understanding is that the 144,000 are recently converted Jewish evangelists sent out to bring sinners to Jesus Christ during the seven-year tribulation period. Preterists believe they are Jewish Christians, sealed for deliverance from the destruction of Jerusalem in 70 AD. Dispensationalist Tim LaHaye, in his commentary Revelation: Illustrated and Made Plain (Zondervan, 1975), considers the 144,000 in Revelation 7 to refer to Jews and those in Revelation 14 to refer to Christians.

==== Jehovah's Witnesses ====
Jehovah's Witnesses believe that exactly 144,000 faithful Christians from Pentecost of 33 AD until the present day will be resurrected to heaven as immortal spirit beings to spend eternity with God and Christ. They believe that these people are "anointed" by God to become part of the spiritual "Israel of God". They believe the 144,000 (which they consider being synonymous with the "little flock" of Luke 12:32) will serve with Christ as king-priests for a thousand years, while all other people accepted by God (the "other sheep" of John 10:16, composed of "the great crowd" of Revelation 7:9,14 and the resurrected "righteous and the unrighteous" ones of Acts 24:15), will be given an opportunity to live forever in a restored paradise on earth.

Individual Witnesses indicate their claim of being "anointed" by partaking of the bread and wine at the annual Memorial of Christ's death. In 2025, around 24,600 Witnesses worldwide claimed to be of the anointed "remnant" of the 144,000, an increase of nearly 14,000 since 2005. The Watch Tower Society has stated that the number of partakers is expected to decrease each year, but has also stated that members should not be concerned about the number increasing. The members of the Governing Body who exercise teaching authority over Jehovah's Witnesses worldwide claim to be among the anointed 144,000 and also consider themselves as a group to be the faithful and discreet slave of Matthew 24:45 and Luke 12:42.

==== The Church of Jesus Christ of Latter-day Saints ====
The Church of Jesus Christ of Latter-day Saints believes that the sealing of the 144,000 relates to the high priests, ordained unto the holy order of God, to administer the everlasting gospel; "for they are they who are ordained out of every nation, kindred, tongue, and people, by the angels to whom is given power over the nations of the earth, to bring as many as will come to the church of the Firstborn."

==== Skoptzists ====
The Christian Skoptsy sect in Russia believed that the Messiah would come when there were 144,000 Skoptsy believers, based on their reading of the Book of Revelation.

==== Unification Church ====
The Unification Church, founded by Reverend Sun Myung Moon, believes the 144,000 represents the total number of saints whom Christ must find "who can restore through indemnity the missions of all the past saints who, despite their best efforts to do God's Will, fell prey to Satan when they failed in their responsibilities. He must find these people during his lifetime and lay the foundation of victory over Satan's world".

=== Islam ===
144,000 is said to have been the number of Companions (Sahaba) of Muhammad, though other totals have been given. The number is also given as the total number of prophets in Islam, although this has also been reported as 124,000 or 244,000. The actual number of prophets or Sahaba is not known; about 30 prophets are mentioned by name in the Qur'an.

== Other uses ==
- Coptic sources calculate the number of Holy Innocents massacred to have been 144,000.
- A Baktun is 20 Katun cycles of the ancient Maya Long Count calendar, which contains 144,000 days.
