= Power of 10 =

Ten raised to an integer power

Visualisation of powers of 10 from one to 1 trillion

In mathematics, a power of 10 is any of the integer powers of the number ten; in other words, ten multiplied by itself a certain number of times (when the power is a positive integer). By definition, the number one is a power (the zeroth power) of ten. The first few non-negative powers of ten are:

1, 10, 100, 1,000, 10,000, 100,000, 1,000,000, 10,000,000... (sequence A011557 in the OEIS)

== Positive powers ==
In decimal notation the nth power of ten is written as '1' followed by n zeroes. It can also be written as 10^{n} or as 1En in E notation. See order of magnitude and orders of magnitude (numbers) for named powers of ten. There are two conventions for naming positive powers of ten, beginning with 10^{9}, called the long and short scales. Where a power of ten has different names in the two conventions, the long scale name is shown in parentheses.

The positive 10 power related to a short scale name can be determined based on its Latin name-prefix using the following formula: 10^{[(prefix-number + 1) × 3]}

Examples:

- billion = 10^{[(2 + 1) × 3]} = 10^{9}
- octillion = 10^{[(8 + 1) × 3]} = 10^{27}

Name	Alternate names	Power	Number	SI symbol	SI prefix
one		0	1		
ten		1	10	da	deca
hundred		2	100	h	hecto
thousand		3	1,000	k	kilo
ten thousand	myriad (Greek)	4	10,000		
hundred thousand	lakh (India)	5	100,000		
million		6	1,000,000	M	mega
ten million	crore (India)	7	10,000,000		
hundred million		8	100,000,000		
billion	milliard (LS)	9	1,000,000,000	G	giga
ten billion		10	10,000,000,000		
hundred billion		11	100,000,000,000		
trillion	billion (LS)	12	1,000,000,000,000	T	tera
ten trillion		13	10,000,000,000,000		
hundred trillion		14	100,000,000,000,000		
quadrillion	billiard (LS)	15	1,000,000,000,000,000	P	peta
quintillion	trillion (LS)	18	...	E	exa
sextillion	trilliard (LS)	21		Z	zetta
septillion	quadrillion (LS)	24		Y	yotta
octillion	quadrilliard (LS)	27		R	ronna
nonillion	quintillion (LS)	30		Q	quetta
decillion	quintilliard (LS)	33			
vigintillion	decilliard (LS)	63			
trigintillion	quindecilliard (LS)	93			
googol		100			
centillion		303			
googolplex		10^{100}			

For further examples, see Names of large numbers. Numbers larger than about a trillion are rarely referred to by name or written out as digits, but instead are typically described with exponent notation.

== Negative powers ==
The sequence of powers of ten can also be extended to negative powers.

Similar to the positive powers, the negative power of 10 related to a short scale name can be determined based on its Latin name-prefix using the following formula: 10^{−[(prefix-number + 1) × 3]}

Examples:

- billionth = 10^{−[(2 + 1) × 3]} = 10^{−9}
- quintillionth = 10^{−[(5 + 1) × 3]} = 10^{−18}

Name	Power	Number	SI symbol	SI prefix
one	0	1		
tenth	−1	0.1	d	deci
hundredth	−2	0.01	c	centi
thousandth	−3	0.001	m	milli
ten-thousandth	−4	0.000 1		
hundred-thousandth	−5	0.000 01		
millionth	−6	0.000 001	μ	micro
billionth	−9	0.000 000 001	n	nano
trillionth	−12	0.000 000 000 001	p	pico
quadrillionth	−15	...	f	femto
quintillionth	−18		a	atto
sextillionth	−21		z	zepto
septillionth	−24		y	yocto
octillionth	−27		r	ronto
nonillionth	−30		q	quecto
decillionth	−33			
googol-minutia	-100			

== Googol and googolplex ==
The number googol is 10^{100}. The term was coined by 9-year-old Milton Sirotta, nephew of American mathematician Edward Kasner. It was popularized in Kasner's 1940 book Mathematics and the Imagination, where it was used to compare and illustrate very large numbers. Googolplex, a much larger power of ten (10 to the googol power, or 10^{10^{100}}), was also introduced in that book.

== Scientific notation ==
Scientific notation is a way of writing numbers of very large and very small sizes compactly.

A number written in scientific notation has a significand (sometime called a mantissa) multiplied by a power of ten.

Sometimes written in the form:

m × 10^{n}

Or more compactly as:

10^{n}

This is generally used to denote powers of 10. Where n is positive, this indicates the number of zeros after the number, and where the n is negative, this indicates the number of decimal places before the number.

As an example:

10^{5} = 100,000
10^{−5} = 0.00001

The notation of mEn, known as E notation, is used in computer programming, spreadsheets and databases, but is not used in scientific papers.

== Properties ==
- All powers of 10 are happy numbers.
- All powers of 10 are Harshad numbers, since the sum of their digits is always 1, which is always divisible by all numbers.

== See also ==
- Power of two
- Power of three
- SI prefix
- Cosmic View, inspiration for the film Powers of Ten
- Exponentiation
- Philip and Phylis Morrison wrote a book called "Powers of Ten: A Book About the Relative Size of Things in the Universe and the Effect of Adding Another Zero" to accompany the video of Eames.
