= 100,000 =

← 99999	100000	100001 →
- List of numbers; Integers; ← 10^{0} 10^{1} 10^{2} 10^{3} 10^{4} 10^{5} 10^{6} 10^{7} 10^{8} 10^{9} 10^{10} 10^{11} 10^{12} 10^{13}
- Cardinal: one hundred thousand
- Ordinal: 100000th (one hundred thousandth)
- Factorization: 2^{5} × 5^{5}
- Greek numeral: $\stackrel{\iota}{\Mu}$
- Roman numeral: C̅, c̅
- Binary: 11000011010100000_{2}
- Ternary: 12002011201_{3}
- Senary: 2050544_{6}
- Octal: 303240_{8}
- Duodecimal: 49A54_{12}
- Hexadecimal: 186A0_{16}
- Egyptian hieroglyph: 𓆐

100,000 (one hundred thousand) is the natural number following 99,999 and preceding 100,001. In scientific notation, it is written as 10^{5}.

== Terms for 100,000 ==
In Bangladesh, India, Pakistan and South Asia, one hundred thousand is called a lakh, and is written as 1,00,000. The Thai, Lao, Khmer and Vietnamese languages also have separate words for this number: แสน, ແສນ, សែន (all saen), and ức respectively. The Malagasy word is hetsy.

In the Netherlands, a 'ton' is a colloquialism for a denomination of 100,000 monetary units. In the guilders period a ton would denote 100,000 guilders. With the introduction of the euro, a ton would come to mean 100,000 euros. Usage is mostly limited to the financial sphere and to the buying and selling of houses. It is not used in official settings because of the ambiguity with the commonly used metric tonne. While usage is common in the Netherlands, it sees almost no use in Belgium.

In Cyrillic numerals, it is known as the legion (легион): or.

== Values of 100,000 ==
In astronomy, 100,000 metres, 100 kilometres, or 100 km (62 miles) is the altitude at which the Fédération Aéronautique Internationale (FAI) defines spaceflight to begin.

In paleoclimatology, the 100,000-year problem is a mismatch between the temperature record and the modeled incoming solar radiation.

In the Irish language, céad míle fáilte (pronounced [ˌceːd̪ˠ ˈmʲiːlʲə ˈfˠaːl̠ʲtʲə]) is a popular greeting meaning "a hundred thousand welcomes".

== Selected 6-digit numbers (100,001–999,999) ==
=== 100,001 to 199,999 ===
- 100,001 = second smallest 6-digit number
- 100,003 = smallest 6-digit prime number
- 100,128 = smallest triangular number with 6 digits and the 447th triangular number
- 100,151 = twin prime with 100,153
- 100,153 = twin prime with 100,151
- 100,255 = Friedman number
- 100,489 = 317^{2}, the smallest 6-digit square
- 101,101 = smallest palindromic Carmichael number
- 101,723 = smallest prime number whose square is a pandigital number containing each digit from 0 to 9
- 102,564 = The smallest parasitic number
- 103,049 = Schröder–Hipparchus number
- 103,680 = highly totient number
- 103,769 = the number of combinatorial types of 5-dimensional parallelohedra
- 103,823 = 47^{3}, the smallest 6-digit cube and nice Friedman number (−1 + 0 + 3×8×2)^{3}
- 104,480 = number of non-isomorphic set-systems of weight 14.
- 104,723 = the 9,999th prime number
- 104,729 = the 10,000th prime number
- 104,869 = the smallest prime number containing every non-prime digit
- 104,976 = 18^{4}, 3-smooth number
- 105,071 = number of triangle-free graphs on 11 vertices
- 105,558 = number of partitions of 46
- 105,664 = harmonic divisor number
- 108,968 = number of signed trees with 11 nodes
- 109,376 = automorphic number
- 110,880 = 30th highly composite number
- 111,111 = repunit
- 111,777 = smallest natural number requiring 17 syllables in American English, 19 in British English
- 113,634 = Motzkin number for n = 14
- 114,243/80,782 ≈ √2
- 114,689 = prime factor of F_{12}
- 115,975 = Bell number
- 116,281 = 341^{2}, square number, centered decagonal number, 18-gonal number
- 117,067 = first vampire prime
- 117,649 = 7^{6}
- 117,800 = harmonic divisor number
- 120,032 = number of primitive polynomials of degree 22 over GF(2)
- 120,284 = Keith number
- 120,960 = highly totient number
- 121,393 = Fibonacci number
- 123,456 = increasing digit pattern
- 123,717 = smallest digitally balanced number in base 7
- 123,867 = number of trees with 18 unlabeled nodes
- 124,754 = number of partitions of 47
- 125,673 = logarithmic number
- 127,777 = smallest natural number requiring 18 syllables in American English, 20 in British English
- 127,912 = Wedderburn–Etherington number
- 128,981 = Starts the first prime gap sequence of 2, 4, 6, 8, 10, 12, 14
- 129,106 = Keith number
- 130,321 = 19^{4}
- 131,071 = Mersenne prime
- 131,072 = 2^{17}, largest determinant of a (real) {0,1}-matrix of order 15.
- 131,361 = Leyland number
- 134,340 = Pluto's minor planet designation
- 135,135 = double factorial of 13
- 135,137 = Markov number
- 142,129 = 377^{2}, square number, dodecagonal number
- 142,857 = Kaprekar number, smallest cyclic number in decimal.
- 144,000 = number with religious significance
- 147,273 = number of partitions of 48
- 147,640 = Keith number
- 148,149 = Kaprekar number
- 152,381 = unique prime in base 20
- 156,146 = Keith number
- 155,921 = smallest prime number being the only prime in an interval from 100n to 100n + 99
- 160,000 = 20^{4}
- 160,176 = number of reduced trees with 26 nodes
- 161,051 = 11^{5}
- 161,280 = highly totient number
- 166,320 = 31st highly composite number
- 167,400 = harmonic divisor number
- 167,894 = number of ways to partition {1,2,3,4,5,6,7,8} and then partition each cell (block) into subcells.
- 173,525 = number of partitions of 49
- 173,600 = harmonic divisor number
- 174,680 = Keith number
- 174,763 = Wagstaff prime
- 176,906 = number of 24-bead necklaces (turning over is allowed) where complements are equivalent
- 177,147 = 3^{11}
- 177,777 = smallest natural number requiring 19 syllables in American English, 21 in British English
- 178,478 = Leyland number
- 181,440 = highly totient number
- 181,819 = Kaprekar number
- 182,362 = number of 23-bead binary necklaces with beads of 2 colors where the colors may be swapped but turning over is not allowed
- 183,186 = Keith number
- 183,231 = number of partially ordered set with 9 unlabeled elements
- 187,110 = Kaprekar number
- 189,819 = number of letters in the longest English word, taking 3 hours to pronounce
- 194,481 = 21^{4}
- 195,000 = smallest triangular number divisible by 1000
- 195,025 = Pell number, Markov number
- 196,418 = Fibonacci number, Markov number
- 196,560 = the kissing number in 24 dimensions
- 196,883 = the dimension of the smallest nontrivial irreducible representation of the Monster group
- 196,884 = the coefficient of q in the Fourier series expansion of the j-invariant. The adjacency of 196883 and 196884 was important in suggesting monstrous moonshine.

=== 200,000 to 299,999 ===
- 200,000 = 2 × 10^{5}
- 202,717 = k such that the sum of the squares of the first k primes is divisible by k.
- 206,098 – Large Schröder number
- 206,265 = rounded number of arc seconds in a radian (see also parsec), since (180 × 60 × 60)/π = 206,264.806...
- 207,360 = highly totient number
- 208,012 = the Catalan number C_{12}
- 208,335 = the largest number to be both triangular and square pyramidal
- 208,495 = Kaprekar number
- 212,159 = smallest unprimeable number ending in 1, 3, 7 or 9
- 221,760 = 32nd highly composite number
- 222,222 = repdigit
- 224,737 = the 20,000th prime number
- 227,475 = Riordan number
- 234,256 = 22^{4}
- 237,510 = harmonic divisor number
- 238,591 = number of free 13-ominoes
- 241,920 = highly totient number
- 242,060 = harmonic divisor number
- 248,832 = 12^{5}, 100,000_{12}, AKA a gross-great-gross (100_{12} great-grosses); the smallest fifth power that can be represented as the sum of only 6 fifth powers: 12^{5} = 4^{5} + 5^{5} + 6^{5} + 7^{5} + 9^{5} + 11^{5}
- 253,293 = number of prime knots with 15 crossings
- 255,168 = number of ways to play tic tac toe
- 262,144 = 2^{18}; exponential factorial of 4; a superperfect number; $\sqrt{2^{6^{2^{1^{4^4}}}}}.$
- 262,468 = Leyland number
- 268,705 = Leyland number
- 271,129 – smallest known Sierpiński prime
- 274,177 = prime factor of the Fermat number F_{6}
- 275,807/195,025 ≈ √2
- 276,480 = number of primitive polynomials of degree 24 over GF(2)
- 277,200 = 33rd highly composite number
- 279,841 = 23^{4}
- 279,936 = 6^{7}
- 280,859 = a prime number whose square 78881777881 is tridigital
- 283,086 = number of primes with distinct digits, the largest being 987,654,103
- 291,400 = number of non-equivalent ways of expressing 100,000,000 as the sum of two prime numbers
- 293,547 = Wedderburn–Etherington number
- 293,999 = twin prime with 294,001, Sophie Germain prime
- 294,001 = smallest weakly prime number in base 10, twin prime with 293,999
- 294,685 = Markov number
- 298,320 = Keith number

=== 300,000 to 399,999 ===
- 310,572 = Motzkin number
- 314,159 = pi-prime
- 316,749 = number of reduced trees with 27 nodes
- 317,811 = Fibonacci number
- 317,955 = number of trees with 19 unlabeled nodes
- 318,682 = Kaprekar number
- 325,878 = Fine number
- 326,981 = alternating factorial
- 329,967 = Kaprekar number
- 331,776 = 24^{4}
- 332,640 = 34th highly composite number; harmonic divisor number
- 333,333 = repdigit
- 333,667 = sexy prime and unique prime
- 333,673 = sexy prime with 333,679
- 333,679 = sexy prime with 333,673
- 337,500 = 2^{2} × 3^{3} × 5^{5}
- 337,594 = number of 25-bead necklaces (turning over is allowed) where complements are equivalent
- 349,716 = number of 24-bead binary necklaces with beads of 2 colors where the colors may be swapped but turning over is not allowed
- 350,377 = the 30,000th prime number
- 351,351 = only known odd abundant number that is not the sum of some of its proper, nontrivial (i.e. >1) divisors (sequence A122036 in the OEIS).
- 351,352 = Kaprekar number
- 355,419 = Keith number
- 356,643 = Kaprekar number
- 356,960 = number of primitive polynomials of degree 23 over GF(2)
- 360,360 = harmonic divisor number; smallest number divisible by the numbers from 1 to 15 (there is no smaller number divisible by the numbers from 1 to 14 since any number divisible by 3 and 5 must be divisible by 15)
- 362,880 = 9!, highly totient number
- 369,119 = prime number which divides the sum of all primes less than or equal to it
- 369,293 = smallest prime with the property that inserting a digit anywhere in the number will always yield a composite
- 370,261 = first prime followed by a prime gap of over 100
- 371,293 = 13^{5}, palindromic in base 12 (15AA51_{12})
- 389,305 = self-descriptive number in base 7
- 390,313 = Kaprekar number
- 390,625 = 5^{8}
- 396,733 = first prime followed by a prime gap of exactly 100. All numbers from 396,734 to 396,832 are composite.
- 397,585 = Leyland number

=== 400,000 to 499,999 ===
- 409,113 = sum of the first nine factorials
- 422,481 = smallest number whose fourth power is the sum of three smaller fourth powers
- 423,393 = Leyland number
- 426,389 = Markov number
- 426,569 = cyclic number in base 12
- 437,760 to 440,319 = any of these numbers will cause the Apple II+ and Apple IIe computers to crash to a monitor prompt when entered at the BASIC prompt, due to a short-cut in the Applesoft code programming of the overflow test when evaluating 16-bit numbers. Entering 440000 at the prompt has been used to hack games that are protected against entering commands at the prompt after the game is loaded.
- 444,444 = repdigit
- 456,976 = 26^{4}
- 461,539 = Kaprekar number
- 466,830 = Kaprekar number
- 470,832 = Pell number
- 479,909 = the 40,000th prime number
- 483,840 = highly totient number
- 492,638 = number of signed trees with 12 nodes
- 498,960 = 35th highly composite number
- 499,393 = Markov number
- 499,500 = Kaprekar number

=== 500,000 to 599,999 ===
- 500,500 = Kaprekar number, sum of first 1,000 integers
- 505,447 = weakly prime
- 509,203 = Riesel prime
- 510,510 = the product of the first seven prime numbers, thus the seventh primorial. It is also the product of four consecutive Fibonacci numbers—13, 21, 34, 55, the largest such sequence of any length to be also a primorial. And it is a double triangular number, the sum of all even numbers from 0 to 1428. Smallest primorial p such that p-1 and p+1 are both composite.
- 514,229 = Fibonacci prime,
- 518,859 = Schröder–Hipparchus number
- 524,287 = Mersenne prime
- 524,288 = 2^{19}
- 524,649 = Leyland number
- 525,600 = minutes in a non-leap year
- 527,040 = minutes in a leap year
- 531,441 = 3^{12}
- 533,169 = Leyland number
- 533,170 = Kaprekar number
- 537,824 = 14^{5}
- 539,400 = harmonic divisor number
- 548,834 = equal to the sum of the sixth powers of its digits
- 554,400 = 36th highly composite number
- 555,555 = repdigit
- 584,141 = weakly prime
- 586,081 = number of prime numbers having seven digits.
- 587,999 = safe prime.

=== 600,000 to 699,999 ===
- 604,171 = weakly prime
- 604,800 = number of seconds in a week
- 611,953 = the 50,000th prime number
- 614,656 = 28^{4}
- 625,992 = Riordan number
- 629,933 = number of reduced trees with 28 nodes
- 645,120 = double factorial of 14
- 646,018 = Markov number
- 649,532 = number of 26-bead necklaces (turning over is allowed) where complements are equivalent
- 664,579 = the number of primes under 10,000,000
- 665,280 = 37th highly composite number
- 665,857/470,832 ≈ √2
- 666,666 = repdigit
- 671,092 = number of 25-bead binary necklaces with beads of 2 colors, where the colors may be swapped but turning over is not allowed
- 676,157 = Wedderburn–Etherington number
- 678,570 = Bell number
- 688,451 = alongside 688,453, the smallest pair of twin primes followed by a gap of at least 1,000 before the next twin prime pair [689,459 and 689,461]
- 694,280 = Keith number
- 695,520 = harmonic divisor number

=== 700,000 to 799,999 ===
- 707,281 = 29^{4}
- 711,569 = the 60,000th prime number
- 720,720 = 10th superior highly composite number; 10th colossally abundant number; 38th highly composite number, smallest number divisible by the numbers from 1 to 16
- 725,760 = highly totient number
- 726,180 = harmonic divisor number
- 729,000 = 90^{3}
- 739,397 = largest prime that is both right- and left-truncatable.
- 742,900 = Catalan number
- 753,480 = harmonic divisor number
- 759,375 = 15^{5}
- 762,701 – smallest known composite Riesel number
- 765,623 = emirp, Friedman prime 5^{6} × 7^{2} − 6 ÷ 3
- 777,743 = largest prime in English not containing the letter 'i' in its name
- 777,777 = repdigit, the smallest natural number requiring 20 syllables in American English, 22 in British English, the largest number in English not containing the letter 'i' in its name
- 783,700 = initial number of third century xx00 to xx99 (after 400 and 1,400) containing seventeen prime numbers (Note: There are no centuries containing more than seventeen primes between 200 and 122,853,771,370,899 inclusive.) {783,701, 783,703, 783,707, 783,719, 783,721, 783,733, 783,737, 783,743, 783,749, 783,763, 783,767, 783,779, 783,781, 783,787, 783,791, 783,793, 783,799}

=== 800,000 to 899,999 ===
- 810,000 = 30^{4}
- 823,065 = number of trees with 20 unlabeled nodes
- 823,543 = 7^{7}
- 825,265 = smallest Carmichael number with 5 prime factors
- 832,040 = Fibonacci number
- 853,467 = Motzkin number
- 857,375 = 95^{3}
- 873,612 = 1^{1} + 2^{2} + 3^{3} + 4^{4} + 5^{5} + 6^{6} + 7^{7}
- 888,888 = repdigit
- 890,625 = automorphic number

=== 900,000 to 999,999 ===
- 901,971 = number of free 14-ominoes
- 909,091 = unique prime in base 10
- 923,521 = 31^{4}
- 925,765 = Markov number
- 925,993 = Keith number
- 950,976 = harmonic divisor number
- 956,619: 956619^2=915119911161, and only the digits 1, 5, 6, and 9 are used in both this number and its square.
- 967,680 = highly totient number
- 970,299 = 99^{3}, the largest 6-digit cube
- 971,767 = weakly prime
- 998,001 = 999^{2}, the largest 6-digit square. The reciprocal of this number, in its expanded form, lists all three-digit numbers in order except 998.
- 998,991 = largest triangular number with 6 digits and the 1413th triangular number
- 999,983 = largest 6-digit prime number and largest 6-digit palindromic prime
- 999,999 = repdigit. Rational numbers with denominators 7 and 13 have 6-digit repetends when expressed in decimal form, because 999999 is the smallest number one less than a power of 10 that is divisible by 7 and by 13.

=== Prime numbers ===
There are 9,592 primes less than 10^{5}, where 99,991 is the largest prime number smaller than 100,000.

Increments of 10^{5} from 100,000 through a one million have the following prime counts:

- 8,392 primes between 100,000 and 200,000. (Note: Smallest p > 100,000 is 100,003 (9,593rd); largest p < 200,000 is 199,999 (17,984th).) This is a difference of 1,200 primes from the previous range.
  - 104,729 is the 10,000th prime, which is in this range.
  - 199,999 is prime.
- 8,013 primes between 200,000 and 300,000. (Note: Smallest p > 200,000 is 200,003 (17,985th); largest p < 300,000 is 299,993 (25,997th).) A difference of 379 primes from the previous range.
  - 224,737 is the 20,000th prime.
- 7,863 primes between 300,000 and 400,000. (Note: Smallest p > 300,000 is 300,007 (25,998th); largest p < 400,000 is 399,989 (33,860th).) A difference of 150 primes from the previous range.
  - 350,377 is the 30,000th prime.
- 7,678 primes between 400,000 and 500,000. (Note: Smallest p > 400,000 is 400,009 (33,861st); largest p < 500,000 is 499,979 (41,538th).) A difference of 185 primes from the previous range. Here, the difference increases by a count of 35.
  - 479,909 is the 40,000th prime.
- 7,560 primes between 500,000 and 600,000. (Note: Smallest p > 500,000 is 500,009 (41,539th); largest p < 600,000 is 599,999 (49,098th).) A difference of 118 primes from the previous range.
  - 7,560 is the twentieth highly composite number.
  - 599,999 is prime.
- 7,445 primes between 600,000 and 700,000. (Note: Smallest p > 600,000 is 600,011 (49,099th); largest p < 700,000 is 699,967 (56,543rd).) A difference of 115 primes from the previous range.
  - 611,953 is the 50,000th prime.
- 7,408 primes between 700,000 and 800,000. (Note: Smallest p > 700,000 is 700,001 (56,544th); largest p < 800,000 is 799,999 (63,951st).) A difference of 37 primes from the previous range.
  - 700,001 and 799,999 are both prime.
  - 746,773 is the 60,000th prime.
- 7,323 primes between 800,000 and 900,000. (Note: Smallest p > 800,000 is 800,011 (63,952nd); largest p < 900,000 is 899,981 (71,274th).) A difference of 85 primes from the previous range. Here, the difference increases by a count of 48.
  - 882,377 is the 70,000th prime.
- 7,224 primes between 900,000 and 1,000,000. (Note: Smallest p > 900,000 is 900,001 (71,275th); largest p < 1,000,000 is 999,983 (78,498th).) A difference of 99 primes from the previous range. The difference increases again, by a count of 14.
  - 900,001 is prime.

In total, there are 68,906 prime numbers between 100,000 and 1,000,000.
