= Delicate prime =

Type of prime number

A delicate prime, digitally delicate prime, or weakly prime number is a prime number where, under a given radix but generally decimal, replacing any one of its digits with any other digit always results in a composite number.

== Definition ==
A prime number is called a digitally delicate prime number when, under a given radix but generally decimal, replacing any one of its digits with any other digit always results in a composite number. A weakly prime base-b number with n digits must produce $(b - 1) \times n$ composite numbers after every digit is individually changed to every other digit. There are infinitely many weakly prime numbers in any base. Furthermore, for any fixed base there is a positive proportion of such primes.

== History ==
In 1978, Murray S. Klamkin posed the question of whether these numbers existed. Paul Erdős proved that there exist an infinite number of "delicate primes" under any base.

In 2007, Jens Kruse Andersen found the 1000-digit weakly prime $(17 \times 10^{1000} - 17) / 99 + 21686652$.

In 2011, Terence Tao proved that delicate primes exist in a positive proportion for all bases. Positive proportion here means as the primes get bigger, the distance between the delicate primes will be quite similar, thus not scarce among prime numbers.

=== Widely digitally delicate primes ===
In 2021, Michael Filaseta of the University of South Carolina tried to find a delicate prime number such that when you add an infinite number of leading zeros to the prime number and change any one of its digits, including the leading zeros, it becomes composite. He called these numbers widely digitally delicate. He with a student of his showed in the paper that there exist an infinite number of these numbers, although they could not produce a single example of this, having looked through 1 to 1 billion. They also proved that a positive proportion of primes are widely digitally delicate.

Jon Grantham gave an explicit example of a 4032-digit widely digitally delicate prime.

== Examples ==
The smallest weakly prime base-b number for bases 2 through 10 are:

Base	In base	Decimal
2	1111111_{2}	127
3	2_{3}	2
4	11311_{4}	373
5	313_{5}	83
6	334155_{6}	28151
7	436_{7}	223
8	14103_{8}	6211
9	3738_{9}	2789
10	294001_{10}	294001

In the decimal number system, the first weakly prime numbers are:

294001, 505447, 584141, 604171, 971767, 1062599, 1282529, 1524181, 2017963, 2474431, 2690201, 3085553, 3326489, 4393139 (sequence A050249 in the OEIS).

For the first of these, each of the 54 numbers 094001, 194001, 394001, ..., 294009 are composite.
