= Leonardo number =

Set of numbers used in the smoothsort algorithm

The Leonardo numbers are a sequence of numbers given by the recurrence:

$$L(n) =
\begin{cases}
1                       & \mbox{if } n = 0 \\
1                       & \mbox{if } n = 1 \\
L(n - 1) + L(n - 2) + 1 & \mbox{if } n > 1 \\
\end{cases}$$

Edsger W. Dijkstra used them as an integral part of his smoothsort algorithm, and also analyzed them in some detail.

A Leonardo prime is a Leonardo number that is also prime.

== Name ==
The term "Leonardo number" was coined by Dijkstra (Note: The OEIS lists Dijkstra's paper as the first reference to the sequence. (sequence A145912 in the OEIS)), and the derivation is not given explicitly. Given the close relationship to the famous sequence credited to Leonardo Fibonacci, he may have considered the subject trivial. There is no known nor likely connection to Leonardo da Vinci, the most common subject of that mononym.

== Values ==
The first few Leonardo numbers are

1, 1, 3, 5, 9, 15, 25, 41, 67, 109, 177, 287, 465, 753, 1219, 1973, 3193, 5167, 8361, ... (sequence A001595 in the OEIS)

The first few Leonardo primes are

3, 5, 41, 67, 109, 1973, 5167, 2692537, 11405773, 126491971, 331160281, 535828591, 279167724889, 145446920496281, 28944668049352441, 5760134388741632239, 63880869269980199809, 167242286979696845953, 597222253637954133837103, ... (sequence A145912 in the OEIS)

== Modulo cycles ==
The Leonardo numbers form a cycle in any modulo $n \geq 2$. An easy way to see it is:

- If a pair of numbers modulo $n$ appears twice in the sequence, then there is a cycle.
- If we assume the main statement is false, using the previous statement, then it would imply there are an infinite number of distinct pairs of numbers between $0$ and $n-1$, which is false since there are $n^2$ such pairs.

The cycles for $n \leq 8$ are:

Modulo	Cycle	Length
2	1	1
3	1,1,0,2,0,0,1,2	8
4	1,1,3	3
5	1,1,3,0,4,0,0,1,2,4,2,2,0,3,4,3,3,2,1,4	20
6	1,1,3,5,3,3,1,5	8
7	1,1,3,5,2,1,4,6,4,4,2,0,3,4,1,6	16
8	1,1,3,5,1,7	6

The cycle always end on the pair $(1,n-1)$, as it is the only pair which can precede the pair $(1,1)$.

== Expressions ==
- The following equation applies:

$$L(n)=2L(n-1)-L(n-3)$$

Proof

$L(n)=L(n-1)+L(n-2)+1=L(n-1)+L(n-2)+1+L(n-3)-L(n-3)=2L(n-1)-L(n-3)$

== Relation to Fibonacci numbers ==
The Leonardo numbers are related to the Fibonacci numbers by the relation $L(n) = 2 F(n+1) - 1, n \ge 0$.

From this relation it is straightforward to derive a closed-form expression for the Leonardo numbers, analogous to Binet's formula for the Fibonacci numbers:

$$L(n) = 2 \frac{\varphi^{n+1} - \psi^{n+1}}{\varphi - \psi}- 1 = \frac{2}{\sqrt 5} \left(\varphi^{n+1} - \psi^{n+1}\right) - 1 = 2F(n+1) - 1$$

where the golden ratio $\varphi = \left(1 + \sqrt 5\right)/2$ and $\psi = \left(1 - \sqrt 5\right)/2$ are the roots of the quadratic polynomial $x^2 - x - 1 = 0$.

== Leonardo polynomials ==
The Leonardo polynomials $L_{n}(x)$ is defined by

$L_{n+2}(x)=xL_{n+1}(x)+L_{n}(x)+x$ with $L_{0}(x) = 1, L_{1}(x)=2x-1.$

Equivalently, in homogeneous form, the Leonardo polynomials can be written as

$$L_{n+3}(x)= (x+1)L_{n+2}(x)-(x-1)L_{n+1}(x)-L_{n}(x):$$

where $L_{0}(x)=1, L_{1}(x)=2x-1$ and $L_{2}(x)=2x^2+1.$

== Examples of Leonardo polynomials ==
$$L_{0}(x)=1 \,$$
$$L_{1}(x)=2x-1\,$$
$$L_{2}(x)=2x^2+1\,$$
$$L_{3}(x)=2x^3+4x-1\,$$
$$L_{4}(x)=2x^4 + 6x^2 + 1 \,$$
$$L_{5}(x)=2x^5+8x^3+6x-1 \,$$
$$L_{6}(x)=2x^6+10x^4+12x^2+1\,$$
$$L_{7}(x)=2x^7+12x^5+20x^3+8x-1 \,$$
$$L_{8}(x)=2 x^8+14 x^6+30 x^4+20 x^2+1 \,$$
$$L_{9}(x)=2 x^9+16 x^7+42 x^5 + 40x^3 + 10x-1 \,$$
$$L_{10}(x)=2 x^{10}+18 x^8+56 x^6+70 x^4+30 x^2+1\,$$
$$L_{11}(x)=2 x^{11}+20 x^9+72 x^7+112 x^5+70 x^3+12x-1 \,$$

Substituting $x=1$ in the above polynomials gives the Leonardo numbers and setting $x=k$ gives the $k$-Leonardo numbers.

== Cited ==
1. P. Catarino, A. Borges (2019): On Leonardo numbers. Acta Mathematica Universitatis Comenianae, 89(1), 75-86. Retrieved from https://www.iam.fmph.uniba.sk/amuc/ojs/index.php/amuc/article/view/1005/799

2. K. Prasad, R. Mohanty, M. Kumari, H. Mahato (2024): Some new families of generalized k-Leonardo and Gaussian Leonardo Numbers, Communications in Combinatorics and Optimization, 9 (3), 539-553. https://comb-opt.azaruniv.ac.ir/article_14544_6844cc9ba641d31cafe5358297bc0096.pdf

3. M. Kumari, K. Prasad, H. Mahato, P. Catarino (2024): On the generalized Leonardo quaternions and associated spinors, Kragujevac Journal of Mathematics 50 (3), 425-438. https://imi.pmf.kg.ac.rs/kjm/pub/kjom503/kjm_50_3-6.pdf

4. K. Prasad, H. Mahato, M. Kumari, R. Mohanty: On the generalized Leonardo Pisano octonions, National Academy Science Letters 47, 579–585. https://link.springer.com/article/10.1007/s40009-023-01291-2

5. Y. Soykan (2023): Special cases of generalized Leonardo numbers: Modified p-Leonardo, p-Leonardo-Lucas and p-Leonardo Numbers, Earthline Journal of Mathematical Sciences. https://www.preprints.org/frontend/manuscript/a700d41e884b69f92bc8eb6cf7ff1979/download_pub

6. Y. Soykan (2021): Generalized Leonardo numbers, Journal of Progressive Research in Mathematics. https://core.ac.uk/download/pdf/483697189.pdf

7. E. Tan, HH Leung (2023): ON LEONARDO p-NUMBERS, Journal of Combinatorial Number Theory. https://math.colgate.edu/~integers/x7/x7.pdf
