= Reciprocals of primes =

Sequence of numbers

The reciprocals of prime numbers have been of interest to mathematicians for various reasons. They do not have a finite sum, as Leonhard Euler proved in 1737.

As rational numbers, the reciprocals of primes have repeating decimal representations. In his later years, George Salmon (1819–1904) concerned himself with the repeating periods of these decimal representations of reciprocals of primes.

Contemporaneously, William Shanks (1812–1882) calculated numerous reciprocals of primes and their repeating periods, and published two papers "On Periods in the Reciprocals of Primes" in 1873 and 1874. In 1874 he also published a table of primes, and the periods of their reciprocals, up to 20,000 (with help from and "communicated by the Rev. George Salmon"), and pointed out the errors in previous tables by three other authors.

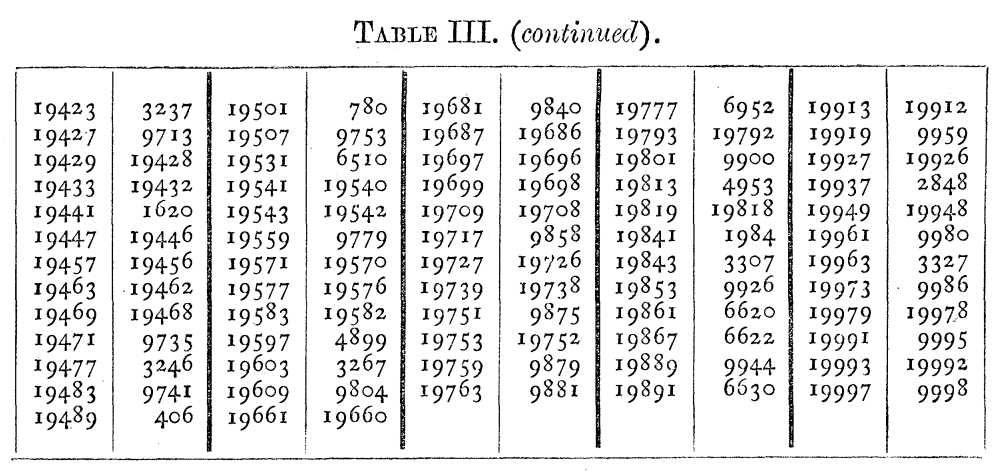
The last part of Shanks's 1874 table of primes and their repeating periods. In the top row, 6952 should be 6592 (the error is easy to find, since the period for a prime p must divide p − 1). In his report extending the table to 30,000 in the same year, Shanks did not report this error, but he reported that in the same column, opposite 19841, the 1984 should be 64. *Another error which may have been corrected since his work was published is opposite 19423—the reciprocal repeats every 6474 digits, not every 3237.

Rules for calculating the periods of repeating decimals from rational fractions were given by James Whitbread Lee Glaisher in 1878. For a prime p, the period of its reciprocal divides p − 1.

The sequence of recurrence periods of the reciprocal primes (sequence A002371 in the OEIS) appears in the 1973 Handbook of Integer Sequences.

== List of reciprocals of primes ==
| Prime (p) | Period length | Reciprocal (1/p) |
|---|---|---|
| 2 | 0 | 0.5 |
| 3 | † 1 | 0.3̅ |
| 5 | 0 | 0.2 |
| 7 | * 6 | 0.1̅4̅2̅8̅5̅7̅ |
| 11 | † 2 | 0.0̅9̅ |
| 13 | 6 | 0.0̅7̅6̅9̅2̅3̅ |
| 17 | * 16 | 0.0̅5̅8̅8̅2̅3̅5̅2̅9̅4̅1̅1̅7̅6̅4̅7̅ |
| 19 | * 18 | 0.0̅5̅2̅6̅3̅1̅5̅7̅8̅9̅4̅7̅3̅6̅8̅4̅2̅1̅ |
| 23 | * 22 | 0.0̅4̅3̅4̅7̅8̅2̅6̅0̅8̅6̅9̅5̅6̅5̅2̅1̅7̅3̅9̅1̅3̅ |
| 29 | * 28 | 0.0̅3̅4̅4̅8̅2̅7̅5̅8̅6̅2̅0̅6̅8̅9̅6̅5̅5̅1̅7̅2̅4̅1̅3̅7̅9̅3̅1̅ |
| 31 | 15 | 0.0̅3̅2̅2̅5̅8̅0̅6̅4̅5̅1̅6̅1̅2̅9̅ |
| 37 | † 3 | 0.0̅2̅7̅ |
| 41 | 5 | 0.0̅2̅4̅3̅9̅ |
| 43 | 21 | 0.0̅2̅3̅2̅5̅5̅8̅1̅3̅9̅5̅3̅4̅8̅8̅3̅7̅2̅0̅9̅3̅ |
| 47 | * 46 | 0.0̅2̅1̅2̅7̅6̅5̅9̅5̅7̅4̅4̅6̅8̅0̅8̅5̅1̅0̅6̅3̅8̅2̅9̅7̅8̅7̅2̅3̅4̅0̅4̅2̅5̅5̅3̅1̅9̅1̅4̅8̅9̅3̅6̅1̅7̅ |
| 53 | 13 | 0.0̅1̅8̅8̅6̅7̅9̅2̅4̅5̅2̅8̅3̅ |
| 59 | * 58 | 0.0̅1̅6̅9̅4̅9̅1̅5̅2̅5̅4̅2̅3̅7̅2̅8̅8̅1̅3̅5̅5̅9̅3̅2̅2̅0̅3̅3̅8̅9̅8̅3̅0̅5̅0̅8̅4̅7̅4̅5̅7̅6̅2̅7̅1̅1̅8̅6̅4̅4̅0̅6̅7̅7̅9̅6̅6̅1̅ |
| 61 | * 60 | 0.0̅1̅6̅3̅9̅3̅4̅4̅2̅6̅2̅2̅9̅5̅0̅8̅1̅9̅6̅7̅2̅1̅3̅1̅1̅4̅7̅5̅4̅0̅9̅8̅3̅6̅0̅6̅5̅5̅7̅3̅7̅7̅0̅4̅9̅1̅8̅0̅3̅2̅7̅8̅6̅8̅8̅5̅2̅4̅5̅9̅ |
| 67 | 33 | 0.0̅1̅4̅9̅2̅5̅3̅7̅3̅1̅3̅4̅3̅2̅8̅3̅5̅8̅2̅0̅8̅9̅5̅5̅2̅2̅3̅8̅8̅0̅5̅9̅7̅ |
| 71 | 35 | 0.0̅1̅4̅0̅8̅4̅5̅0̅7̅0̅4̅2̅2̅5̅3̅5̅2̅1̅1̅2̅6̅7̅6̅0̅5̅6̅3̅3̅8̅0̅2̅8̅1̅6̅9̅ |
| 73 | 8 | 0.0̅1̅3̅6̅9̅8̅6̅3̅ |
| 79 | 13 | 0.0̅1̅2̅6̅5̅8̅2̅2̅7̅8̅4̅8̅1̅ |
| 83 | 41 | 0.0̅1̅2̅0̅4̅8̅1̅9̅2̅7̅7̅1̅0̅8̅4̅3̅3̅7̅3̅4̅9̅3̅9̅7̅5̅9̅0̅3̅6̅1̅4̅4̅5̅7̅8̅3̅1̅3̅2̅5̅3̅ |
| 89 | 44 | 0.0̅1̅1̅2̅3̅5̅9̅5̅5̅0̅5̅6̅1̅7̅9̅7̅7̅5̅2̅8̅0̅8̅9̅8̅8̅7̅6̅4̅0̅4̅4̅9̅4̅3̅8̅2̅0̅2̅2̅4̅7̅1̅9̅1̅ |
| 97 | * 96 | 0.0̅1̅0̅3̅0̅9̅2̅7̅8̅3̅5̅0̅5̅1̅5̅4̅6̅3̅9̅1̅7̅5̅2̅5̅7̅7̅3̅1̅9̅5̅8̅7̅6̅2̅8̅8̅6̅5̅9̅7̅9̅3̅8̅1̅4̅4̅3̅2̅9̅8̅9̅6̅9̅0̅7̅2̅1̅6̅4̅9̅4̅8̅4̅5̅3̅6̅0̅8̅2̅4̅7̅4̅2̅2̅6̅8̅0̅4̅1̅2̅3̅7̅1̅1̅3̅4̅0̅2̅0̅6̅1̅8̅5̅5̅6̅7̅ |
| 101 | † 4 | 0.0̅0̅9̅9̅ |
| 103 | 34 | 0.0̅0̅9̅7̅0̅8̅7̅3̅7̅8̅6̅4̅0̅7̅7̅6̅6̅9̅9̅0̅2̅9̅1̅2̅6̅2̅1̅3̅5̅9̅2̅2̅3̅3̅ |
| 107 | 53 | 0.0̅0̅9̅3̅4̅5̅7̅9̅4̅3̅9̅2̅5̅2̅3̅3̅6̅4̅4̅8̅5̅9̅8̅1̅3̅0̅8̅4̅1̅1̅2̅1̅4̅9̅5̅3̅2̅7̅1̅0̅2̅8̅0̅3̅7̅3̅8̅3̅1̅7̅7̅5̅7̅ |
| 109 | * 108 | 0.0̅0̅9̅1̅7̅4̅3̅1̅1̅9̅2̅6̅6̅0̅5̅5̅0̅4̅5̅8̅7̅1̅5̅5̅9̅6̅3̅3̅0̅2̅7̅5̅2̅2̅9̅3̅5̅7̅7̅9̅8̅1̅6̅5̅1̅3̅7̅6̅1̅4̅6̅7̅8̅8̅9̅9̅0̅8̅2̅5̅6̅8̅8̅0̅7̅3̅3̅9̅4̅4̅9̅5̅4̅1̅2̅8̅4̅4̅0̅3̅6̅6̅9̅7̅2̅4̅7̅7̅0̅6̅4̅2̅2̅0̅1̅8̅3̅4̅8̅6̅2̅3̅8̅5̅3̅2̅1̅1̅ |
| 113 | * 112 | 0.0̅0̅8̅8̅4̅9̅5̅5̅7̅5̅2̅2̅1̅2̅3̅8̅9̅3̅8̅0̅5̅3̅0̅9̅7̅3̅4̅5̅1̅3̅2̅7̅4̅3̅3̅6̅2̅8̅3̅1̅8̅5̅8̅4̅0̅7̅0̅7̅9̅6̅4̅6̅0̅1̅7̅6̅9̅9̅1̅1̅5̅0̅4̅4̅2̅4̅7̅7̅8̅7̅6̅1̅0̅6̅1̅9̅4̅6̅9̅0̅2̅6̅5̅4̅8̅6̅7̅2̅5̅6̅6̅3̅7̅1̅6̅8̅1̅4̅1̅5̅9̅2̅9̅2̅0̅3̅5̅3̅9̅8̅2̅3̅ |
| 127 | 42 | 0.0̅0̅7̅8̅7̅4̅0̅1̅5̅7̅4̅8̅0̅3̅1̅4̅9̅6̅0̅6̅2̅9̅9̅2̅1̅2̅5̅9̅8̅4̅2̅5̅1̅9̅6̅8̅5̅0̅3̅9̅3̅7̅ |

* Full reptend primes are italicised.
† Unique primes are highlighted.

== Full reptend primes ==
A full reptend prime, full repetend prime, proper prime or long prime in base b is an odd prime number p such that the Fermat quotient

$$q_p(b) = \frac{b^{p - 1} - 1}{p}$$

(where p does not divide b) gives a cyclic number with p − 1 digits. Therefore, the base b expansion of $1/p$ repeats the digits of the corresponding cyclic number infinitely.

== Unique primes ==
A prime p (where p ≠ 2, 5 when working in base 10) is called unique if there is no other prime q such that the period length of the decimal expansion of its reciprocal, 1/p, is equal to the period length of the reciprocal of q, 1/q. For example, 3 is the only prime with period 1, 11 is the only prime with period 2, 37 is the only prime with period 3, 101 is the only prime with period 4, so they are unique primes. The next larger unique prime is 9091 with period 10, though the next larger period is 9 (its prime being 333667). Unique primes were described by Samuel Yates in 1980. A prime number p is unique if and only if there exists an n such that

$$\frac{\Phi_n(10)}{\gcd(\Phi_n(10), n)}$$

is a power of p, where $\Phi_n(b)$ denotes the $n$th cyclotomic polynomial evaluated at $b$. The value of n is then the period of the decimal expansion of 1/p.

At present, more than fifty decimal unique primes or probable primes are known. However, there are only twenty-three unique primes below 10^{100}.

The decimal unique primes are

3, 11, 37, 101, 9091, 9901, 333667, 909091, ... (sequence A040017 in the OEIS).
