= 100,000,000 =

100000000
- List of numbers; Integers; ← 10^{0} 10^{1} 10^{2} 10^{3} 10^{4} 10^{5} 10^{6} 10^{7} 10^{8} 10^{9} 10^{10} 10^{11} 10^{12} 10^{13}
- Cardinal: One hundred million
- Ordinal: 100000000th (one hundred millionth)
- Factorization: 2^{8} × 5^{8}
- Greek numeral: $\stackrel{\alpha}{\Mu}$
- Roman numeral: C
- Binary: 101111101011110000100000000_{2}
- Ternary: 20222011112012201_{3}
- Senary: 13531202544_{6}
- Octal: 575360400_{8}
- Duodecimal: 295A6454_{12}
- Hexadecimal: 5F5E100_{16}

100,000,000 (one hundred million) is the natural number following 99,999,999 and preceding 100,000,001.

In scientific notation, it is written as 10^{8}.

East Asian languages treat 100,000,000 as a counting unit, significant as the square of a myriad, also a counting unit. In Chinese, Korean, and Japanese respectively it is yi (simplified Chinese: 亿; traditional Chinese: 億; pinyin: yì) (or Chinese: 萬萬; pinyin: wànwàn in ancient texts), eok (억/億) and oku (億). These languages do not have single words for a thousand to the second, third, fifth powers, etc.

100,000,000 is also the fourth power of 100 and also the square of 10,000.

== Selected 9-digit numbers (100,000,001–999,999,999) ==
=== 100,000,001 to 199,999,999 ===
- 100,000,007 = smallest nine digit prime
- 100,005,153 = smallest triangular number with 9 digits and the 14,142nd triangular number
- 100,020,001 = 10001^{2}, palindromic square
- 100,544,625 = 465^{3}, the smallest 9-digit cube
- 102,030,201 = 10101^{2}, palindromic square
- 102,334,155 = Fibonacci number
- 104,636,890 = number of trees with 25 unlabeled nodes
- 107,890,609 = Wedderburn-Etherington number
- 111,111,111 = repunit, square root of 12345678987654321
- 111,111,113 = Chen prime, Sophie Germain prime, cousin prime.
- 120,528,657 = number of centered hydrocarbons with 27 carbon atoms
- 122,522,400 = least number $m$ such that $\frac{\sigma(m)}{m} > 5$, where $\sigma(m)$ = sum of divisors of m
- 123,456,789 = smallest zeroless base-10 pandigital number
- 126,390,032 = number of 34-bead necklaces (turning over is allowed) where complements are equivalent
- 126,491,971 = Leonardo prime
- 129,145,076 = Leyland number using 3 & 17 (3^{17} + 17^{3})
- 129,644,790 = Catalan number
- 130,150,588 = number of 33-bead binary necklaces with beads of 2 colors where the colors may be swapped but turning over is not allowed
- 134,217,728 = 512^{3} = 8^{9} = 2^{27}
- 134,218,457 = Leyland number using 2 & 27 (2^{27} + 27^{2})
- 134,219,796 = number of 32-bead necklaces with 2 colors when turning over is not allowed; also number of output sequences from a simple 32-stage cycling shift register; also number of binary irreducible polynomials whose degree divides 32
- 136,279,841 = The largest known Mersenne prime exponent, as of October 2024
- 139,854,276 = 11826^{2}, the smallest zeroless base 10 pandigital square
- 142,547,559 = Motzkin number
- 157,115,917 = number of parallelogram polyominoes with 24 cells.
- 165,580,141 = Fibonacci number
- 167,444,795 = cyclic number in base 6
- 171,794,492 = number of reduced trees with 36 nodes
- 177,264,449 = Leyland number using 8 & 9 (8^{9} + 9^{8})
- 178,956,971 = smallest composite Wagstaff number with prime index
- 185,794,560 = double factorial of 18
- 188,378,402 = number of ways to partition {1,2,...,11} and then partition each cell (block) into subcells.
- 190,899,322 = Bell number
- 192,622,052 = number of free 18-ominoes
- 193,707,721 = smallest prime factor of 2^{67} − 1, a number that Mersenne claimed to be prime
- 199,960,004 = number of surface-points of a tetrahedron with edge-length 9999

=== 200,000,000 to 299,999,999 ===
- 200,000,002 = number of surface-points of a tetrahedron with edge-length 10000
- 210,295,326 = Fine number
- 211,016,256 = number of primitive polynomials of degree 33 over GF(2)
- 212,890,625 = 1-automorphic number
- 222,222,227 = safe prime
- 223,092,870 = the product of the first nine prime numbers, thus the ninth primorial
- 225,058,681 = Pell number
- 225,331,713 = self-descriptive number in base 9
- 232,792,560 = superior highly composite number; colossally abundant number; smallest number divisible by the numbers from 1 to 22 (there is no smaller number divisible by the numbers from 1 to 20 since any number divisible by 3 and 7 must be divisible by 21 and any number divisible by 2 and 11 must be divisible by 22)
- 240,882,152 = number of signed trees with 16 nodes
- 244,140,625 = 15625^{2} = 625^{3} = 125^{4} = 25^{6} = 5^{12}
- 244,389,457 = Leyland number using 5 & 12 (5^{12} + 12^{5})
- 245,044,800 = first highly composite number that is not a Harshad number
- 245,492,244 = number of 35-bead necklaces (turning over is allowed) where complements are equivalent
- 252,648,992 = number of 34-bead binary necklaces with beads of 2 colors where the colors may be swapped but turning over is not allowed
- 253,450,711 = Wedderburn-Etherington prime
- 260,301,176 = number of 33-bead necklaces with 2 colors when turning over is not allowed; also number of output sequences from a simple 33-stage cycling shift register; also number of binary irreducible polynomials whose degree divides 33
- 267,914,296 = Fibonacci number
- 268,436,240 = Leyland number using 2 & 28 (2^{28} + 28^{2})
- 268,473,872 = Leyland number using 4 & 14 (4^{14} + 14^{4})
- 272,400,600 = the number of terms of the harmonic series required to pass 20
- 275,305,224 = the number of magic squares of order 5, excluding rotations and reflections
- 279,793,450 = number of trees with 26 unlabeled nodes
- 292,475,249 = Leyland number using 7 & 10 (7^{10} + 10^{7})
- 294,130,458 = number of prime knots with 19 crossings
- 299,792,458 = the exact definition of the speed of light in a vacuum, in metres per second

=== 300,000,000 to 399,999,999 ===
- 309,576,725 = number of centered hydrocarbons with 28 carbon atoms
- 321,534,781 = Markov prime
- 331,160,281 = Leonardo prime
- 336,849,900 = number of primitive polynomials of degree 34 over GF(2)
- 350,238,175 = number of reduced trees with 37 nodes
- 362,802,072 = number of parallelogram polyominoes with 25 cells
- 364,568,617 = Leyland number using 6 & 11 (6^{11} + 11^{6})
- 367,567,200 = 14th colossally abundant number, 14th superior highly composite number
- 381,654,729 = the only polydivisible number that is also a zeroless pandigital number
- 387,420,489 = 19683^{2} = 729^{3} = 27^{6} = 9^{9} = 3^{18} and in tetration notation ^{2}9
- 387,426,321 = Leyland number using 3 & 18 (3^{18} + 18^{3})

=== 400,000,000 to 499,999,999 ===
- 400,763,223 = Motzkin number
- 404,204,977 = number of prime numbers having ten digits
- 405,071,317 = 1^{1} + 2^{2} + 3^{3} + 4^{4} + 5^{5} + 6^{6} + 7^{7} + 8^{8} + 9^{9}
- 433,494,437 = Fibonacci prime, Markov prime
- 442,386,619 = alternating factorial
- 444,101,658 = number of (unordered, unlabeled) rooted trimmed trees with 27 nodes
- 455,052,511 = number of primes below 10^{10}
- 467,871,369 = number of triangle-free graphs on 14 vertices
- 477,353,376 = number of 36-bead necklaces (turning over is allowed) where complements are equivalent
- 477,638,700 = Catalan number
- 479,001,599 = factorial prime
- 479,001,600 = 12!
- 490,853,416 = number of 35-bead binary necklaces with beads of 2 colors where the colors may be swapped but turning over is not allowed
- 499,999,751 = Sophie Germain prime

=== 500,000,000 to 599,999,999 ===
- 505,294,128 = number of 34-bead necklaces with 2 colors when turning over is not allowed; also number of output sequences from a simple 34-stage cycling shift register; also number of binary irreducible polynomials whose degree divides 34
- 535,828,591 = Leonardo prime
- 536,870,911 = third composite Mersenne number with a prime exponent
- 536,870,912 = 2^{29}
- 536,871,753 = Leyland number using 2 & 29 (2^{29} + 29^{2})
- 543,339,720 = Pell number
- 554,999,445 = a Kaprekar constant for digit length 9 in base 10
- 556,069,849 = 14,149 × 39,301, the 1,000th strong pseudoprime to base 2
- 574,304,985 = 1^{9} + 2^{9} + 3^{9} + 4^{9} + 5^{9} + 6^{9} + 7^{9} + 8^{9} + 9^{9}
- 575,023,344 = 14-th derivative of x^{x} at x=1
- 596,572,387 = Wedderburn-Etherington prime

=== 600,000,000 to 699,999,999 ===
- 617,323,716 = 24846^{2}, palindromic square
- 635,318,657 = the smallest number that is the sum of two fourth powers in two different ways (59^{4} + 158^{4} = 133^{4} + 134^{4}), of which Euler was aware.
- 644,972,544 = 864^{3}, 3-smooth number
- 648,646,704 = φ(10^{9}−1), where φ is the Euler's totient function
- 654,729,075 = double factorial of 19
- 670,617,279 = highest stopping time integer under 10^{9} for the Collatz conjecture

=== 700,000,000 to 799,999,999 ===
- 701,408,733 = Fibonacci number
- 715,497,037 = number of reduced trees with 38 nodes
- 715,827,883 = Wagstaff prime, Jacobsthal prime
- 725,594,112 = number of primitive polynomials of degree 36 over GF(2)
- 742,624,232 = number of free 19-ominoes
- 751,065,460 = number of trees with 27 unlabeled nodes
- 774,840,978 = Leyland number using 9 & 9 (9^{9} + 9^{9})
- 778,483,932 = Fine number
- 780,291,637 = Markov prime
- 787,109,376 = 1-automorphic number
- 797,790,928 = number of centered hydrocarbons with 29 carbon atoms

=== 800,000,000 to 899,999,999 ===
- 810,810,000 = smallest number with exactly 1000 factors
- 837,759,792 – number of parallelogram polyominoes with 26 cells.
- 839,296,300 – initial number of first century xx00 to xx99 containing at least sixteen prime numbers {839,296,301, 839,296,303, 839,296,309, 839,296,319, 839,296,321, 839,296,327, 839,296,331, 839,296,333, 839,296,349, 839,296,351, 839,296,357, 839,296,361, 839,296,373, 839,296,379, 839,296,397, 839,296,399} since 2,705,000 (Note: The ratio of 839,296,300 to 2,704,900 is easily the largest ratio between consecutive centuries with more than fifteen prime numbers.)
- 893,554,688 = 2-automorphic number

=== 900,000,000 to 999,999,999 ===
- 906,150,257 = smallest counterexample to the Polya conjecture
- 923,187,456 = 30384^{2}, the largest zeroless base-10 pandigital square
- 928,772,650 = number of 37-bead necklaces (turning over is allowed) where complements are equivalent
- 929,275,200 = number of primitive polynomials of degree 35 over GF(2)
- 981,706,832 = number of 35-bead necklaces with 2 colors when turning over is not allowed; also number of output sequences from a simple 35-stage cycling shift register; also number of binary irreducible polynomials whose degree divides 35
- 987,654,321 = largest zeroless base-10 pandigital number
- 997,002,999 = 999^{3}, the largest 9-digit cube
- 999,950,884 = 31622^{2}, the largest 9-digit square
- 999,961,560 = largest triangular number with 9 digits and the 44,720th triangular number
- 999,999,937 = largest 9-digit prime number
