= 1,000,000 =

← 999999	1000000	1000001 →
- List of numbers; Integers; ← 10^{0} 10^{1} 10^{2} 10^{3} 10^{4} 10^{5} 10^{6} 10^{7} 10^{8} 10^{9} 10^{10} 10^{11} 10^{12} 10^{13}
- Cardinal: one million
- Ordinal: 1000000th (one millionth)
- Factorization: 2^{6} × 5^{6}
- Greek numeral: $\stackrel{\rho}{\Mu}$
- Roman numeral: M̅, m̅
- Binary: 11110100001001000000_{2}
- Ternary: 1212210202001_{3}
- Senary: 33233344_{6}
- Octal: 3641100_{8}
- Duodecimal: 402854_{12}
- Hexadecimal: F4240_{16}
- Egyptian hieroglyph: 𓁨

1,000,000 (one million), or one thousand thousand, is the natural number following 999,999 and preceding 1,000,001. The word is derived from the early Italian millione (milione in modern Italian), from mille, "thousand", plus the augmentative suffix -one.

It is commonly abbreviated:

- in British English as m (not to be confused with the metric prefix "m" milli, for 10^{−3}, or with metre),
- M,
- MM ("thousand thousands", from Latin "Mille"; not to be confused with the Roman numeral MM = 2,000),
- mm (not to be confused with millimetre), or
- mn, mln, or mio can be found in financial contexts.

In scientific notation, it is written as 1×10^{6} or 10^{6}. Physical quantities can also be expressed using the SI prefix mega (M), when dealing with SI units; for example, 1 megawatt (1 MW) equals 1,000,000 watts.

The meaning of the word "million" is common to the short scale and long scale numbering systems, unlike the larger numbers, which have different names in the two systems.

The million is sometimes used in the English language as a metaphor for a very large number, as in "Not in a million years" and "You're one in a million", or a hyperbole, as in "I've walked a million miles" and "You've asked a million-dollar question".

1,000,000 is also the square of 1000 and the cube of 100.

== Visualising one million ==
Visualisation of powers of ten from 1 to 1 million

Even though it is often stressed that counting to precisely a million would be an exceedingly tedious task due to the time and concentration required, there are many ways to bring the number "down to size" in approximate quantities, ignoring irregularities or packing effects.

- Information: Not counting spaces, the text printed on 136 pages of an Encyclopædia Britannica, or 600 pages of pulp paperback fiction contains approximately one million characters.
- Length: There are one million millimetres in a kilometre, and roughly a million sixteenths of an inch in a mile (1 sixteenth = 0.0625). A typical car tire might rotate a million times in a 1,900-kilometre (1,200 mi) trip, while the engine would do several times that number of revolutions.
- Fingers: If the width of a human finger is 22 mm (7/8 in), then a million fingers lined up would cover a distance of 22 km (14 mi). If a person walks at a speed of 4 km/h (2.5 mph), it would take them approximately five and a half hours to reach the end of the fingers.
- Area: A square a thousand objects or units on a side contains a million such objects or square units, so a million holes might be found in less than three square yards of window screen, or similarly, in about one half square foot (400–500 cm^{2}) of bed sheet cloth. A city lot 70 by 100 feet is about a million square inches.
- Volume: The cube root of one million is one hundred, so a million objects or cubic units is contained in a cube a hundred objects or linear units on a side. A million grains of table salt or granulated sugar occupies about 64 mL (2.3 imp fl oz; 2.2 US fl oz), the volume of a cube one hundred grains on a side. One million cubic inches would be the volume of a small room 8 1/3 feet long by 8 1/3 feet wide by 8 1/3 feet high.
- Mass: A million cubic millimetres (small droplets) of water would have a volume of one litre and a mass of one kilogram. A million millilitres or cubic centimetres (one cubic metre) of water has a mass of a million grams or one tonne.
- Weight: A million 80-milligram (1.2 gr) honey bees would weigh the same as an 80 kg (180 lb) person.
- Landscape: A pyramidal hill 600 feet (180 m) wide at the base and 100 feet (30 m) high would weigh about a million short tons.
- Computer: A display resolution of 1,280 by 800 pixels contains 1,024,000 pixels.
- Money: A U.S. dollar bill of any denomination has a mass of 1 gram (0.035 oz). One million dollar bills have a mass of 1 megagram (1,000 kg; 2,200 lb) or 1 tonne (just over 1 short ton).
- Time: A million seconds, 1 megasecond, is 11.57 days.

In Indian English and Pakistani English, it is also expressed as 10 lakh. Lakh is derived from lakṣa for 100,000 in Sanskrit.

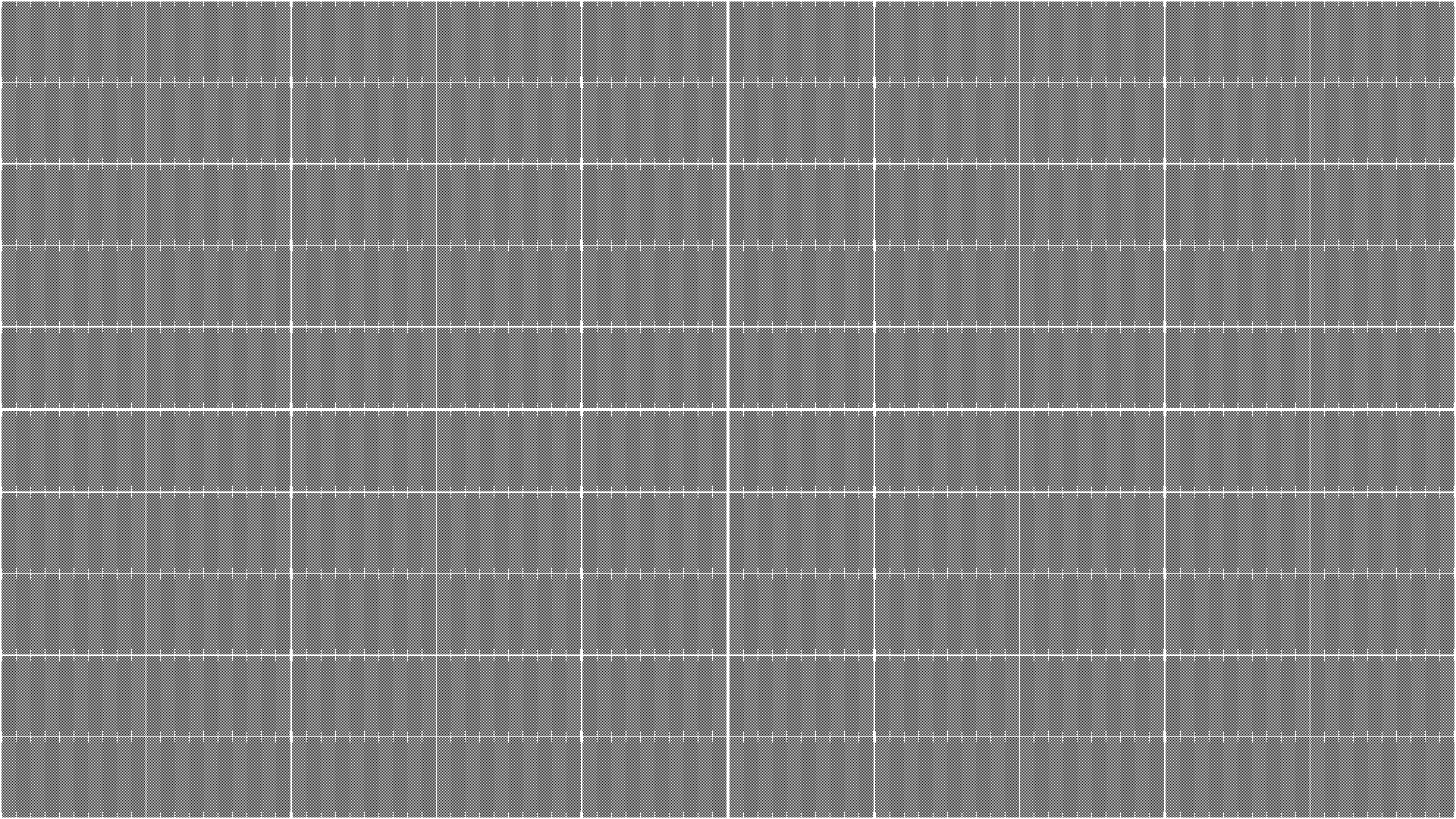
One million black dots (pixels) – each tile with white or grey background contains 1000 dots (full image)

== Selected 7-digit numbers (1,000,001–9,999,999) ==
=== 1,000,001 to 1,999,999 ===
- 1,000,003 = Smallest 7-digit prime number
- 1,000,405 = Smallest triangular number with 7 digits and the 1,414th triangular number
- 1,002,001 = 1001^{2}, palindromic square
- 1,006,003 = largest known generalized Wieferich prime in base 3, and only one apart from 11
- 1,006,301 = First number of the first pair of prime quadruplets occurring thirty apart ({1006301, 1006303, 1006307, 1006309} and {1006331, 1006333, 1006337, 1006339})
- 1,024,000 = Sometimes, the number of bytes in a megabyte
- 1,030,301 = 101^{3}, palindromic cube
- 1,037,718 = Large Schröder number
- 1,048,576 = 1024^{2} = 32^{4} = 16^{5} = 4^{10} = 2^{20}, the number of bytes in a mebibyte (previously called a megabyte)
- 1,048,976 = smallest 7 digit Leyland number
- 1,058,576 = Leyland number
- 1,058,841 = 7^{6} x 3^{2}
- 1,077,871 = the amount of prime numbers between 0 and 16777216(2^24)
- 1,081,080 = 39th highly composite number
- 1,084,051 = fifth Keith prime
- 1,089,270 = harmonic divisor number
- 1,111,111 = repunit
- 1,112,083 = logarithmic number
- 1,129,308^{32} + 1 is prime
- 1,136,689 = Pell number, Markov number
- 1,174,281 = Fine number
- 1,185,921 = 1089^{2} = 33^{4}
- 1,200,304 = 1^{7} + 2^{7} + 3^{7} + 4^{7} + 5^{7} + 6^{7} + 7^{7}
- 1,203,623 = smallest unprimeable number ending in 3
- 1,234,321 = 1111^{2}, palindromic square
- 1,246,863 = Number of 27-bead necklaces (turning over is allowed) where complements are equivalent
- 1,256,070 = number of reduced trees with 29 nodes
- 1,262,180 = number of triangle-free graphs on 12 vertices
- 1,278,818 = Markov number
- 1,290,872 = number of 26-bead binary necklaces with beads of 2 colours where the colours may be swapped but turning over is not allowed
- 1,296,000 = number of primitive polynomials of degree 25 over GF(2)
- 1,299,709 = 100,000th prime number
- 1,334,961 = the number of possible arrangements of the integers 1, 2, ..., 10 with the restriction that the integer j must not be in the j-th postition for each j, $1 \leq j \leq 10$.
- 1,336,336 = 1156^{2} = 34^{4}
- 1,346,269 = Fibonacci number, Markov number
- 1,367,631 = 111^{3}, palindromic cube
- 1,388,705 = number of prime knots with 16 crossings
- 1,413,721 = square triangular number
- 1,419,857 = 17^{5}
- 1,421,280 = harmonic divisor number
- 1,441,440 = 11th colossally abundant number, 11th superior highly composite number, 40th highly composite number
- 1,441,889 = Markov number
- 1,500,625 = 1225^{2} = 35^{4}
- 1,539,720 = harmonic divisor number
- 1,563,372 = Wedderburn-Etherington number
- 1,594,323 = 3^{13}
- 1,596,520 = Leyland number
- 1,606,137 = number of ways to partition {1,2,3,4,5,6,7,8,9} and then partition each cell (block) into subcells.
- 1,607,521/1,136,689 ≈ √2
- 1,647,086 = Leyland number
- 1,671,800 = Initial number of first century xx00 to xx99 consisting entirely of composite numbers
- 1,679,616 = 1296^{2} = 36^{4} = 6^{8}
- 1,686,049 = Markov prime
- 1,687,989 = number of square (0,1)-matrices without zero rows and with exactly 7 entries equal to 1
- 1,719,900 = number of primitive polynomials of degree 26 over GF(2)
- 1,730,787 = Riordan number
- 1,741,725 = equal to the sum of the seventh power of its digits
- 1,771,561 = 1331^{2} = 121^{3} = 11^{6}, also, Commander Spock's estimate for the tribble population in the Star Trek episode "The Trouble with Tribbles"
- 1,864,637 = k such that the sum of the squares of the first k primes is divisible by k.
- 1,874,161 = 1369^{2} = 37^{4}
- 1,889,568 = 18^{5}
- 1,928,934 = 2 x 3^{9} x 7^{2}
- 1,941,760 = Leyland number
- 1,953,125 = 125^{3} = 5^{9}
- 1,978,405 = 1^{6} + 2^{6} + 3^{6} + 4^{6} + 5^{6} + 6^{6} + 7^{6} + 8^{6} + 9^{6} + 10^{6}

=== 2,000,000 to 2,999,999 ===
- 2,000,002 = number of surface-points of a tetrahedron with edge-length 1000
- 2,000,376 = 126^{3}
- 2,012,174 = Leyland number
- 2,012,674 = Markov number
- 2,027,025 = double factorial of 15
- 2,085,136 = 1444^{2} = 38^{4}
- 2,097,152 = 128^{3} = 8^{7} = 2^{21}
- 2,097,593 = Leyland prime using 2 & 21 (2^{21} + 21^{2})
- 2,118,107 = largest integer $n\le10^{10}$ such that $\sum_{k=0}^{22}\omega(n+k)\le57$, where $\omega(n)$ is the prime omega function for distinct prime factors. The corresponding sum for 2118107 is indeed 57.
- 2,124,679 = largest known Wolstenholme prime
- 2,144,505 = number of trees with 21 unlabelled nodes
- 2,162,160 = 41st highly composite number, 2079th triangular number
- 2,177,399 = smallest pandigital number in base 8.
- 2,178,309 = Fibonacci number
- 2,222,222 = repdigit
- 2,266,502 = number of signed trees with 13 nodes
- 2,274,205 = number of different ways of expressing 1,000,000,000 as the sum of two prime numbers
- 2,313,441 = 1521^{2} = 39^{4}
- 2,356,779 = Motzkin number
- 2,405,236 = Number of 28-bead necklaces (turning over is allowed) where complements are equivalent
- 2,423,525 = Markov number
- 2,476,099 = 19^{5}
- 2,485,534 = number of 27-bead binary necklaces with beads of 2 colours where the colours may be swapped but turning over is not allowed
- 2,515,169 = number of reduced trees with 30 nodes
- 2,560,000 = 1600^{2} = 40^{4}
- 2,567,284 = number of partially ordered set with 10 unlabelled elements
- 2,598,560 = chances of getting a royal flush in a hand of poker (52!/5!47!) (n choose r)
- 2,646,723 = little Schröder number
- 2,674,440 = Catalan number
- 2,692,537 = Leonardo prime
- 2,704,900 = initial number of fourth century xx00 to xx99 containing seventeen prime numbers (Note: There are no centuries containing more than seventeen primes between 200 and 122,853,771,370,899 inclusive, and none containing more than fifteen between 2,705,000 and 839,296,299 inclusive.) {2,704,901, 2,704,903, 2,704,907, 2,704,909, 2,704,927, 2,704,931, 2,704,937, 2,704,939, 2,704,943, 2,704,957, 2,704,963, 2,704,969, 2,704,979, 2,704,981, 2,704,987, 2,704,993, 2,704,997}
- 2,744,210 = Pell number
- 2,796,203 = Wagstaff prime, Jacobsthal prime
- 2,825,761 = 1681^{2} = 41^{4}
- 2,890,625 = 1-automorphic number
- 2,922,509 = Markov prime
- 2,985,984 = 1728^{2} = 144^{3} = 12^{6} = 1,000,000_{12} AKA a great-great-gross

=== 3,000,000 to 3,999,999 ===
- 3,111,696 = 1764^{2} = 42^{4}
- 3,200,000 = 20^{5}
- 3,263,443 = sixth term of Sylvester's sequence
- 3,276,509 = Markov prime
- 3,294,172 = 2^{2}×7^{7}
- 3,301,819 = alternating factorial
- 3,333,333 = repdigit
- 3,360,633 = palindromic in 3 consecutive bases: 6281826_{9} = 3360633_{10} = 1995991_{11}
- 3,418,801 = 1849^{2} = 43^{4}
- 3,426,576 = number of free 15-ominoes
- 3,524,578 = Fibonacci number, Markov number
- 3,554,688 = 2-automorphic number
- 3,626,149 = Wedderburn–Etherington prime
- 3,628,800 = 10!
- 3,748,096 = 1936^{2} = 44^{4}
- 3,880,899/2,744,210 ≈ √2

=== 4,000,000 to 4,999,999 ===
- 4,008,004 = 2002^{2}, palindromic square
- 4,037,913 = sum of the first ten factorials
- 4,084,101 = 21^{5}
- 4,100,625 = 2025^{2} = 45^{4}
- 4,194,304 = 2048^{2} = 4^{11} = 2^{22}
- 4,194,788 = Leyland number
- 4,202,496 = number of primitive polynomials of degree 27 over GF(2)
- 4,208,945 = Leyland number
- 4,210,818 = equal to the sum of the seventh powers of its digits
- 4,213,597 = Bell number
- 4,260,282 = Fine number
- 4,297,512 = 12-th derivative of x^{x} at x=1
- 4,324,320 = 12th colossally abundant number, 12th superior highly composite number, pronic number
- 4,400,489 = Markov number
- 4,444,444 = repdigit
- 4,477,456 = 2116^{2} = 46^{4}
- 4,636,390 = Number of 29-bead necklaces (turning over is allowed) where complements are equivalent
- 4,741,632 = number of primitive polynomials of degree 28 over GF(2)
- 4,782,969 = 2187^{2} = 9^{7} = 3^{14}
- 4,782,974 = n such that n | (3^{n} + 5)
- 4,785,713 = Leyland number
- 4,794,088 = number of 28-bead binary necklaces with beads of 2 colours where the colours may be swapped but turning over is not allowed
- 4,805,595 = Riordan number
- 4,826,809 = 2197^{2} = 169^{3} = 13^{6}
- 4,879,681 = 2209^{2} = 47^{4}
- 4,913,000 = 170^{3}
- 4,937,284 = 2222^{2}

=== 5,000,000 to 5,999,999 ===
- 5,049,816 = number of reduced trees with 31 nodes
- 5,096,876 = number of prime numbers having eight digits
- 5,134,240 = the largest number that cannot be expressed as the sum of distinct fourth powers
- 5,153,632 = 22^{5}
- 5,195,977 = smallest number n such that the sum of reciprocals of primes up to n exceeds 3
- 5,221,225 = 2285^{2}, palindromic square
- 5,293,446 = Large Schröder number
- 5,308,416 = 2304^{2} = 48^{4}
- 5,496,925 = first cyclic number in base 6
- 5,555,555 = repdigit
- 5,623,756 = number of trees with 22 unlabelled nodes
- 5,702,887 = Fibonacci number
- 5,761,455 = the number of primes under 100,000,000
- 5,764,801 = 2401^{2} = 49^{4} = 7^{8}
- 5,882,353 = 588^{2} + 2353^{2}

=== 6,000,000 to 6,999,999 ===
- 6,250,000 = 2500^{2} = 50^{4}
- 6,436,343 = 23^{5}
- 6,536,382 = Motzkin number
- 6,625,109 = Pell number, Markov number
- 6,666,666 = repdigit
- 6,765,201 = 2601^{2} = 51^{4}
- 6,948,496 = 2636^{2}, palindromic square

=== 7,000,000 to 7,999,999 ===
- 7,109,376 = 1-automorphic number
- 7,311,616 = 2704^{2} = 52^{4}
- 7,453,378 = Markov number
- 7,529,536 = 2744^{2} = 196^{3} = 14^{6}
- 7,652,413 = Largest n-digit pandigital prime
- 7,777,777 = repdigit
- 7,779,311 = A hit song written by Prince and released in 1982 by The Time
- 7,861,953 = Leyland number
- 7,890,481 = 2809^{2} = 53^{4}
- 7,906,276 = pentagonal triangular number
- 7,913,837 = Keith number
- 7,962,624 = 24^{5}

=== 8,000,000 to 8,999,999 ===
- 8,000,000 = 200^{3}, Used to represent infinity in Japanese mythology
- 8,053,393 = number of prime knots with 17 crossings
- 8,108,731 = repunit prime in base 14
- 8,388,607 = second composite Mersenne number with a prime exponent
- 8,388,608 = 2^{23}
- 8,389,137 = Leyland number
- 8,399,329 = Markov number
- 8,436,379 = Wedderburn-Etherington number
- 8,503,056 = 2916^{2} = 54^{4}
- 8,675,309 = A hit song for Tommy Tutone (also a twin prime with 8,675,311)
- 8,675,311 = Twin prime with 8,675,309
- 8,877,691 = number of nonnegative integers with distinct decimal digits
- 8,888,888 = repdigit
- 8,946,176 = self-descriptive number in base 8
- 8,964,800 = Number of 30-bead necklaces (turning over is allowed) where complements are equivalent

=== 9,000,000 to 9,999,999 ===
- 9,000,000 = 3000^{2}
- 9,069,229 = 13 × 293 × 2,381, Strong pseudoprime to base two, first strong pseudoprime to have a multiplicative order above 100,000 (104,244)
- 9,150,625 = 3025^{2} = 55^{4}
- 9,227,465 = Fibonacci number, Markov number
- 9,256,396 = number of 29-bead binary necklaces with beads of 2 colours where the colours may be swapped but turning over is not allowed
- 9,261,000 = 210^{3}
- 9,369,319 = Newman–Shanks–Williams prime
- 9,647,009 = Markov number
- 9,653,449 = square Stella octangula number
- 9,581,014 = n such that n | (3^{n} + 5)
- 9,663,500 = Initial number of first century xx00 to xx99 that possesses an identical prime pattern to any century with four or fewer digits: its prime pattern of {9663503, 9663523, 9663527, 9663539, 9663553, 9663581, 9663587} is identical to {5903, 5923, 5927, 5939, 5953, 5981, 5987}
- 9,694,845 = Catalan number
- 9,699,690 = eighth primorial
- 9,765,625 = 3125^{2} = 25^{5} = 5^{10}
- 9,800,817 = equal to the sum of the seventh powers of its digits
- 9,834,496 = 3136^{2} = 56^{4}
- 9,865,625 = Leyland number
- 9,926,315 = equal to the sum of the seventh powers of its digits
- 9,938,375 = 215^{3}, the largest 7-digit cube
- 9,997,156 = largest triangular number with 7 digits and the 4,471st triangular number
- 9,998,244 = 3162^{2}, the largest 7-digit square
- 9,999,991 = Largest 7-digit prime number
- 9,999,999 = repdigit

=== Prime numbers ===
There are 78,498 primes less than 10^{6}, where 999,983 is the largest prime number smaller than 1,000,000.

Increments of 10^{6} from 1 million through a 10 million have the following prime counts:

- 70,435 primes between 1,000,000 and 2,000,000.
- 67,883 primes between 2,000,000 and 3,000,000.
- 66,330 primes between 3,000,000 and 4,000,000.
- 65,367 primes between 4,000,000 and 5,000,000.
- 64,336 primes between 5,000,000 and 6,000,000.
- 63,799 primes between 6,000,000 and 7,000,000.
- 63,129 primes between 7,000,000 and 8,000,000.
- 62,712 primes between 8,000,000 and 9,000,000.
- 62,090 primes between 9,000,000 and 10,000,000.

In total, there are 586,081 prime numbers between 1,000,000 and 10,000,000.

== See also ==
- Huh (god), depictions of whom were also used in hieroglyphs to represent 1,000,000
- Megagon
- Millionaire
- Names of large numbers
- Orders of magnitude (numbers) to help compare dimensionless numbers between 1,000,000 and 10,000,000 (10^{6} and 10^{7})
