= 10,000,000 =

10000000
- List of numbers; Integers; ← 10^{0} 10^{1} 10^{2} 10^{3} 10^{4} 10^{5} 10^{6} 10^{7} 10^{8} 10^{9} 10^{10} 10^{11} 10^{12} 10^{13}
- Cardinal: Ten million
- Ordinal: 10000000th (ten millionth)
- Factorization: 2^{7} · 5^{7}
- Greek numeral: $\stackrel{\alpha}{\Mu}$
- Roman numeral: X
- Greek prefix: hebdo-
- Binary: 100110001001011010000000_{2}
- Ternary: 200211001102101_{3}
- Senary: 554200144_{6}
- Octal: 46113200_{8}
- Duodecimal: 3423054_{12}
- Hexadecimal: 989680_{16}

10,000,000 (ten million) is the natural number following 9,999,999 and preceding 10,000,001.

In scientific notation, it is written as 10^{7}.

In South Asia except for Sri Lanka, it is known as the crore.

In Cyrillic numerals, it is known as the vran (вран — raven).

== Selected 8-digit numbers (10,000,001–99,999,999) ==
=== 10,000,001 to 19,999,999 ===
- 10,000,019 = Smallest 8-digit prime number
- 10,001,628 = Smallest triangular number with 8 digits and the 4,472nd triangular number
- 10,004,569 = 3163^{2}, the smallest 8-digit square
- 10,077,696 = 216^{3} = 6^{9}, the smallest 8-digit cube
- 10,172,638 = Number of reduced trees with 32 nodes
- 10,321,920 = Double factorial of 16
- 10,600,510 = Number of signed trees with 14 nodes
- 10,609,137 = Leyland number using 6 & 9 (6^{9} + 9^{6})
- 10,976,184 = Logarithmic number
- 11,405,773 = Leonardo prime
- 11,436,171 = Keith number
- 11,485,154 = Markov number
- 12,252,240 = Highly composite number, smallest number divisible by the numbers from 1 to 18
- 12,648,430 = Hexadecimal C0FFEE, resembling the word "coffee"; used as a placeholder in computer programming, see hexspeak.
- 12,890,625 = 1-automorphic number
- 12,960,000 = 3600^{2} = 60^{4} = (3·4·5)^{4}, Plato's "nuptial number" (Republic VIII; see regular number)
- 12,988,816 = Number of different ways of covering an 8-by-8 square with 32 1-by-2 dominoes
- 13,079,255 = Number of free 16-ominoes
- 13,782,649 = Markov number
- 14,352,282 = Leyland number = 3^{15} + 15^{3}
- 14,549,535 = Smallest number divisible by the first 10 odd numbers (1, 3, 5, 7, 9, 11, 13, 15, 17 and 19).
- 14,828,074 = Number of trees with 23 unlabeled nodes
- 14,930,352 = Fibonacci number
- 15,240,955 – 15,240,955/12,096,754 ≈ ∛2
- 15,485,863 = 1,000,000th prime number
- 15,548,694 = Fine number
- 15,600,000 = The number of years equal to the half-life of curium-247 (^{247}Cm), the longest-lived isotope of curium
- 15,994,428 = Pell number
- 16,609,837 = Markov number
- 16,733,779 = Number of ways to partition {1,2,...,10} and then partition each cell (block) into sub-cells.
- 16,777,216 = 4096^{2} = 256^{3} = 64^{4} = 16^{6} = 8^{8} = 4^{12} = 2^{24} — hexadecimal "million" (0x1000000), number of possible colors in 24/32-bit Truecolor computer graphics
- 16,777,792 = Leyland number = 2^{24} + 24^{2}
- 16,797,952 = Leyland number = 4^{12} + 12^{4}
- 16,964,653 = Markov number
- 17,016,602 = Index of a prime Woodall number
- 17,334,801 = Number of 31-bead necklaces (turning over is allowed) where complements are equivalent
- 17,650,828 = 1^{1} + 2^{2} + 3^{3} + 4^{4} + 5^{5} + 6^{6} + 7^{7} + 8^{8}
- 17,820,000 = Number of primitive polynomials of degree 30 over GF(2)
- 17,896,832 = Number of 30-bead binary necklaces with beads of 2 colors where the colors may be swapped but turning over is not allowed
- 18,199,284 = Motzkin number
- 18,407,808 = Number of primitive polynomials of degree 29 over GF(2)
- 19,680,277 = Wedderburn-Etherington number
- 19,987,816 = Palindromic in 3 consecutive bases: 41AAA14_{13}, 2924292_{14}, 1B4C4B1_{15}

=== 20,000,000 to 29,999,999 ===
- 20,031,170 = Markov number
- 20,543,579 = Number of reduced trees with 33 nodes
- 20,797,002 = Number of triangle-free graphs on 13 vertices
- 21,531,778 = Markov number
- 21,621,600 = 13th colossally abundant number, 13th superior highly composite number
- 23,456,789 = Largest 8-digit prime number that strictly contains increasing digits. The symmetrical decomposition of this prime number produces 3 primes, those of which are: 23, 4567, and 89
- 24,157,817 = Fibonacci number, Markov number
- 24,678,050 = Naraccistic number
- 24,684,612 = 1^{8} + 2^{8} + 3^{8} + 4^{8} + 5^{8} + 6^{8} + 7^{8} + 8^{8}
- 24,883,200 = superfactorial of 6
- 25,502,500 = Sum of the first 100 cubed numbers
- 27,644,437 = Bell number

=== 30,000,000 to 39,999,999 ===
- 31,172,165 = Smallest Proth exponent for n = 10223 (see Seventeen or Bust)
- 31,536,000 = Standard number of seconds in a non-leap year (omitting leap seconds)
- 31,622,400 = Standard number of seconds in a leap year (omitting leap seconds)
- 33,445,755 = Keith number
- 33,550,336 = Fifth perfect number
- 33,554,432 = Leyland number using 8 & 8 (8^{8} + 8^{8}); 32^{5} = 2^{25}, number of directed graphs on 5 labeled nodes
- 33,555,057 = Leyland number using 2 & 25 (2^{25} + 25^{2})
- 33,588,234 = Number of 32-bead necklaces (turning over is allowed) where complements are equivalent
- 34,459,425 = Double factorial of 17
- 34,636,834 = Number of 31-bead binary necklaces with beads of 2 colors where the colors may be swapped but turning over is not allowed
- 35,153,041 = 5929^{2} = 77^{4}
- 35,357,670 = 16th Catalan number
- 36,614,981 = Alternating factorial
- 38,613,965 = Pell number, Markov number
- 38,815,051 = amount of minutes in the average human lifetime of 73.8 calendar years.
- 39,088,169 = Fibonacci number
- 39,299,897 = Number of trees with 24 unlabeled nodes
- 39,905,269 = Number of square (0,1)-matrices without zero rows and with exactly 8 entries equal to 1
- 39,916,800 = 11!
- 39,916,801 = Factorial prime

=== 40,000,000 to 49,999,999 ===
- 41,602,425 = Number of reduced trees with 34 nodes
- 41,791,750 = The sum of the first 500 squared numbers
- 43,050,817 = Leyland number using 3 & 16 (3^{16} + 16^{3})
- 43,112,609 = Mersenne prime exponent
- 43,443,858 = Palindromic in 3 consecutive bases: 3C323C3_{15}, 296E692_{16}, 1DA2AD1_{17}
- 43,484,701 = Markov number
- 44,121,607 = Keith number
- 44,317,196 = Smallest digitally balanced number in base 9
- 45,086,079 = Number of prime numbers having nine digits
- 45,136,576 = Leyland number using 7 & 9 (7^{9} + 9^{7})
- 46,026,618 = Wedderburn-Etherington number
- 46,749,427 = Number of a partially ordered set with 11 unlabeled elements
- 47,176,870 = Fifth busy beaver number
- 47,326,700 = First number of the first consecutive centuries each consisting wholly of composite numbers
- 47,326,800 = First number of the first century with the same prime pattern (in this case, no primes) as the previous century
- 48,024,900 = Square triangular number
- 48,140,288 = As Long As Possible total frames
- 48,266,466 = Number of prime knots with 18 crossings
- 48,928,105 = Markov number
- 48,989,176 = Leyland number using 5 & 11 (5^{11} + 11^{5})

=== 50,000,000 to 59,999,999 ===
- 50,107,909 = Number of free 17-ominoes
- 50,235,931 = Number of signed trees with 15 nodes
- 50,847,534 = Number of primes under 1,000,000,000
- 50,852,019 = Motzkin number
- 57,048,048 = Fine number
- 57,885,161 = Mersenne prime exponent

=== 60,000,000 to 69,999,999 ===
- 61,466,176 = Leyland number using 6 & 10 (6^{10} + 10^{6})
- 61,871,425 = approximate number of planck lengths to amount to one rontometer.
- 63,245,986 = Fibonacci number, Markov number
- 64,000,000 = 8000^{2} = 400^{3} = 20^{6} — vigesimal "million" (1 alau in Mayan, 1 poaltzonxiquipilli in Nahuatl)
- 65,108,062 = Number of 33-bead necklaces (turning over is allowed) where complements are equivalent
- 66,600,049 = Largest minimal prime in base 10
- 67,108,864 = 8192^{2} = 4^{13} = 2^{26}, number of primitive polynomials of degree 32 over GF(2)
- 67,109,540 = Leyland number using 2 & 26 (2^{26} + 26^{2})
- 67,110,932 = Number of 32-bead binary necklaces with beads of 2 colors where the colors may be swapped but turning over is not allowed
- 67,137,425 = Leyland number using 4 & 13 (4^{13} + 13^{4})
- 68,041,019 = Number of parallelogram polyominoes with 23 cells.
- 69,273,666 = Number of primitive polynomials of degree 31 over GF(2)

=== 70,000,000 to 79,999,999 ===
- 72,546,283 = The smallest prime number preceded and followed by prime gaps of over 100
- 73,939,133 = The largest right-truncatable prime number in decimal
- 74,207,281 = Mersenne prime exponent
- 77,232,917 = Mersenne prime exponent
- 78,442,645 = Markov number

=== 80,000,000 to 89,999,999 ===
- 82,589,933 = Mersenne prime exponent
- 84,440,886 = Number of reduced trees with 35 nodes
- 86,400,000 = hyperfactorial of 5; 1^{1} × 2^{2} × 3^{3} × 4^{4} × 5^{5}
- 87,109,376 = 1-automorphic number
- 87,539,319 = taxicab number

=== 90,000,000 to 99,999,999 ===
- 90,767,360 = Generalized Euler number
- 93,222,358 = Pell number
- 93,554,688 = 2-automorphic number
- 94,109,401 = Square pentagonal number
- 94,418,953 = Markov prime
- 96,342,400 = Triple factorial of 23
- 99,897,344 = 464^{3}, the largest 8-digit cube
- 99,980,001 = 9999^{2}, the largest 8-digit square
- 99,990,001 = unique prime
- 99,991,011 = Largest triangular number with 8 digits and the 14,141st triangular number
- 99,999,989 = Greatest prime number with 8 digits
- 99,999,999 = Repdigit, Friedman number, believed to be smallest number to be both repdigit and Friedman

== See also ==
- Hebdometre
