= 10,000,000,000,000 =

10000000000000
- List of numbers; Integers; ← 10^{0} 10^{1} 10^{2} 10^{3} 10^{4} 10^{5} 10^{6} 10^{7} 10^{8} 10^{9} 10^{10} 10^{11} 10^{12} 10^{13}
- Cardinal: Ten trillion (short scale); Ten billion (long scale); Ten thousand billion Ten million million
- Ordinal: 10000000000000th (ten trillionth, short scale)
- Factorization: 2^{13}; 5^{13}
- Divisors: 196 total
- Greek numeral: $\stackrel{\iota}{\Mu}$
- Roman numeral: N/A, n/a
- Binary: 10010001100001001110011100101010000000000000_{2}
- Ternary: 1022101222202012020020211101_{3}
- Senary: 33133534145024144_{6}
- Octal: 221411634520000_{8}
- Duodecimal: 1156097925054_{12}
- Hexadecimal: 9184E72A000_{16}
- Arabic: ١٠٠٠٠٠٠٠٠٠٠٠٠٠
- Bengali: ১০০০০০০০০০০০০০
- Devanagari: १०००००००००००००
- Khmer: ១០០០០០០០០០០០០០
- Tamil: க௦௦௦௦௦௦௦௦௦௦௦௦௦
- Thai: ๑๐๐๐๐๐๐๐๐๐๐๐๐๐ (สิบล้านล้าน)

10,000,000,000,000 (ten trillion on the short scale; ten billion on the long scale; ten thousand billion; ten million million) is the natural number following 9,999,999,999,999 and preceding 10,000,000,000,001. It is known as 10000 arab, 100 kharab, 10 lakh crore, or 1 nil in the Indian numbering system.

== Properties and usage ==
10,000,000,000,000 has the following properties and usage:

=== In mathematics ===
- It is a even, composite, abundant, polite, practical, frugal, and a regular that is a power of 10. It is also a perfect power, a harshad number, and a happy number.
- It is written in scientific notation as 1 × 10^{13} or 10^{13} (1E+13 or simply 1E13 in E notation).
- It has a total of 196 divisors (182 even, 14 odd). All divisors are displayed below:

1, 2, 4, 5, 8, 10, 16, 20, 25, 32, 40, 50, 64, 80, 100, 125, 128, 160, 200, 250, 256, 320, 400, 500, 512, 625, 640, 800, 1000, 1024, 1250, 1280, 1600, 2000, 2048, 2500, 2560, 3125, 3200, 4000, 4096, 5000, 5120, 6250, 6400, 8000, 8192, 10000, 10240, 12500, 12800, 15625, 16000, 20000, 20480, 25000, 25600, 31250, 32000, 40000, 40960, 50000, 51200, 62500, 64000, 78125, 80000, 100000, 102400, 125000, 128000, 156250, 160000, 200000, 204800, 250000, 256000, 312500, 320000, 390625, 400000, 500000, 512000, 625000, 640000, 781250, 800000, 1000000, 1024000, 1250000, 1280000, 1562500, 1600000, 1953125, 2000000, 2500000, 2560000, 3125000, 3200000, 3906250, 4000000, 5000000, 5120000, 6250000, 6400000, 7812500, 8000000, 9765625, 10000000, 12500000, 12800000, 15625000, 16000000, 19531250, 20000000, 25000000, 25600000, 31250000, 32000000, 39062500, 40000000, 48828125, 50000000, 62500000, 64000000, 78125000, 80000000, 97656250, 100000000, 125000000, 128000000, 156250000, 160000000, 195312500, 200000000, 244140625, 250000000, 312500000, 320000000, 390625000, 400000000, 488281250, 500000000, 625000000, 640000000, 781250000, 800000000, 976562500, 1000000000, 1220703125, 1250000000, 1562500000, 1600000000, 1953125000, 2000000000, 2441406250, 2500000000, 3125000000, 3200000000, 3906250000, 4000000000, 4882812500, 5000000000, 6250000000, 7812500000, 8000000000, 9765625000, 10000000000, 12500000000, 15625000000, 16000000000, 19531250000, 20000000000, 25000000000, 31250000000, 39062500000, 40000000000, 50000000000, 62500000000, 78125000000, 80000000000, 100000000000, 125000000000, 156250000000, 200000000000, 250000000000, 312500000000, 400000000000, 500000000000, 625000000000, 1000000000000, 1250000000000, 2000000000000, 2500000000000, 5000000000000, 10000000000000

- The sum of all its divisors, including itself, is 24,998,474,116,998.
- It has an Euler totient of 4,000,000,000,000, and an aliquot sum of 14,998,474,116,998.
- There are a total of 346,065,536,839 positive primes less than it.
- Below is the list of basic calculations of 10,000,000,000,000:

	Multiplication $\scriptstyle{\text{10,000,000,000,000 }\times\text{ x}}$	Division $\scriptstyle{\text{10,000,000,000,000 }\div\text{ x}}$	Exponentiation $\scriptstyle{\text{10,000,000,000,000}^\text{x}}$	nth root $\scriptstyle{\sqrt[\text{x}]{\text{10,000,000,000,000}}}$
2	20,000,000,000,000	5,000,000,000,000	10^{26}	≈3,162,277.6602
3	30,000,000,000,000	3,333,333,333,333.3̅	10^{39}	≈21,544.3469
4	40,000,000,000,000	2,500,000,000,000	10^{52}	≈1,778.2794
5	50,000,000,000,000	2,000,000,000,000	10^{65}	≈398.1072
6	60,000,000,000,000	1,666,666,666,666.6̅	10^{78}	≈146.7799
7	70,000,000,000,000	1,428,571,428,571.4̅2̅8̅5̅7̅1̅	10^{91}	≈71.9686
8	80,000,000,000,000	1,250,000,000,000	10^{104}	≈42.1697
9	90,000,000,000,000	1,111,111,111,111.1̅	10^{117}	≈27.8256
10	100,000,000,000,000	1,000,000,000,000	10^{130}	≈19.9526

=== In economy ===
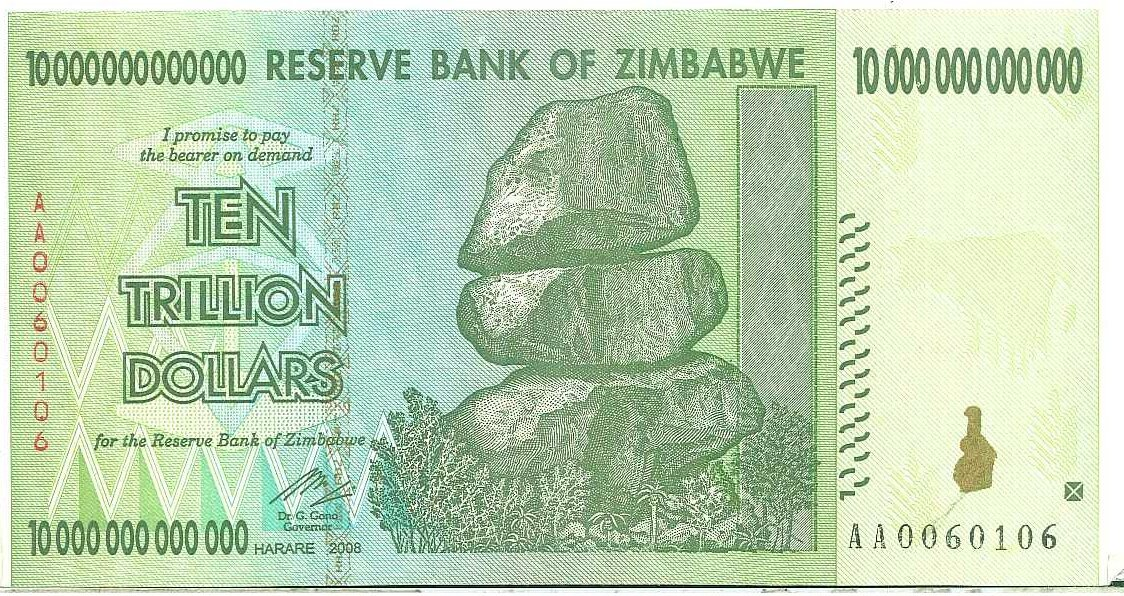
10 trillion Zimbabwean Dollars (2008)

- 10,000,000,000,000 was used in Banknotes of Zimbabwe: 2008 banknote series circulated due to the intense hyperinflation in Zimbabwe during the 2008-2009 period.
- 40,608,506,856,903 dollars of US debt as of November 15, 2026.

== Selected 14-digit numbers (10,000,000,000,001–99,999,999,999,999) ==
=== 10,000,000,000,001 to 19,999,999,999,999 ===
- 10,000,000,000,037 : smallest 14-digit prime number
- 10,000,002,437,316 : smallest 14-digit triangular number, 4,472,136th triangular number
- 10,153,507,819,457 : 177th Markov number
- 10,445,360,463,871 : 38th Woodall number
- 10,610,209,857,723 : 64th Fibonacci number
- 11,038,251,159,312 : number of 51-bead necklaces (turning over is allowed) where complements are equivalent
- 11,111,111,111,111 : repunit
- 11,258,999,739,560 : number of 50-bead binary necklaces with beads of 2 colors where the colors may be swapped but turning over is not allowed
- 12,345,678,910,111 : 2nd Champernowne prime
- 13,046,940,568,625 : number of series-reduced planted trees with 48 nodes
- 13,432,403,613,621 : number of secondary structures of RNA molecules with 37 nucleotides
- 13,933,569,346,707 : 32nd Motzkin number
- 13,974,537,376,800 : 75th superabundant number
- 14,173,019,355,266 : 178th Markov number
- 14,235,090,298,445 : 179th Markov number
- 14,622,039,889,385 : 180th Markov number
- 15,988,960,048,321 : 181st Markov number
- 17,167,680,177,565 : 65th Fibonacci number, 182nd Markov number
- 17,592,186,044,416 = 2^{44}, power of two
- 18,367,353,072,152 : 26th Catalan number
- 18,632,716,502,400 : 76th superabundant number
- 18,696,424,380,481 : 183rd Markov number
- 19,374,186,136,140 : 41st Wedderburn-Etherington number
- 19,696,509,177,019 : 16th alternating factorial

=== 20,000,000,000,000 to 29,999,999,999,999 ===
- 20,000,000,000,000 : an estimate on the number of red blood cells in the human body.
- 20,922,789,888,000 = 16!. The total number of Leibniz terms (signed products) evaluated for a 16×16 integer matrix (n = 16)
- 20,922,789,888,136 : 16th factoriangular number
- 21,246,581,423,810 : 184th Markov number
- 21,300,003,689,580 : 36th Pell number
- 21,440,476,741,631 : 39th Woodall number
- 21,651,955,485,304 : number of 52-bead necklaces (turning over is allowed) where complements are equivalent
- 22,076,468,764,192 : number of 51-bead binary necklaces with beads of 2 colors where the colors may be swapped but turning over is not allowed
- 22,222,222,222,222 : repdigit
- 22,592,065,572,301 : 185th Markov number
- 23,571,113,171,923 : Smarandache–Wellin number
- 24,351,056,611,103 : number of (unordered, unlabeled) rooted trimmed trees with 39 nodes
- 26,500,373,448,281 : 186th Markov number
- 27,673,060,569,305 : number of series-reduced planted trees with 49 nodes
- 27,777,890,035,288 : 66th Fibonacci number
- 27,949,074,753,600 : 77th superabundant number
- 29,998,559,671,349 : Spongebob's number. In the episode "Have You Seen This Snail?", SpongeBob is given a challenge of hitting a paddle ball 29,998,559,671,349 times in a row.

=== 30,000,000,000,000 to 39,999,999,999,999 ===
- 30,901,824,368,813 : 187th Markov number
- 31,801,503,090,601 : 188th Markov number
- 32,607,253,879,200 : 78th superabundant number
- 33,333,333,333,333 : repdigit
- 33,843,022,209,066 : number of secondary structures of RNA molecules with 38 nucleotides
- 35,184,372,088,832 = 2^{45}, power of two
- 36,332,699,889,481 : 189th Markov number
- 38,596,477,083,550 : number of square (0,1)-matrices without zero rows and with exactly 12 entries equal to 1

=== 40,000,000,000,000 to 49,999,999,999,999 ===
- 40,002,464,776,083 : 33rd Motzkin number
- 40,081,787,109,376 : 25th automorphic number
- 42,486,822,491,890 : number of 53-bead necklaces (turning over is allowed) where complements are equivalent
- 43,303,843,861,744 : number of 52-bead binary necklaces with beads of 2 colors where the colors may be swapped but turning over is not allowed
- 43,520,999,798,747 : 50th repfigit
- 43,980,465,111,039 : 40th Woodall number
- 44,444,444,444,444 : repdigit
- 44,945,570,212,853 : 67th Fibonacci number, 190th Markov number
- 46,127,828,641,049 : 191st Markov number
- 46,384,328,517,112 : 42nd Wedderburn-Etherington number
- 47,574,827,600,981 : 21st Schröder–Hipparchus number
- 48,795,987,025,021 : 192nd Markov number

=== 50,000,000,000,000 to 59,999,999,999,999 ===
- 51,011,754,393,600 = 26!!
- 51,422,757,785,981 : 37th Pell number, 193rd Markov number
- 55,555,555,555,555 : repdigit
- 55,898,149,507,200 : 79th superabundant number
- 57,850,602,535,042 : 194th Markov number
- 58,734,306,828,191 : number of series-reduced planted trees with 50 nodes
- 59,918,212,890,625 : 26th automorphic number

=== 60,000,000,000,000 to 69,999,999,999,999 ===
- 60,941,642,779,903 : number of (unordered, unlabeled) rooted trimmed trees with 40 nodes
- 65,082,055,350,517 : 195th Markov number
- 65,214,507,758,400 : 80th superabundant number, 19th superior highly composite number
- 65,359,477,124,183 : When multiplied by the multiples of 17, the product is a repdigit. For example:

Number	times	Multiples of 17	equals	Product
65,359,477,124,183	×	17	=	1,111,111,111,111,111
65,359,477,124,183	×	34	=	2,222,222,222,222,222
65,359,477,124,183	×	51	=	3,333,333,333,333,333
65,359,477,124,183	×	68	=	4,444,444,444,444,444
65,359,477,124,183	×	85	=	5,555,555,555,555,555

- 66,666,666,666,666 : repdigit, beastly number
- 67,082,333,460,610 : 196th Markov number
- 68,275,077,901,156 : number of posets with 15 unlabeled elements
- 69,533,550,916,004 : 27th Catalan number

=== 70,000,000,000,000 to 79,999,999,999,999 ===
- 70,368,744,177,664 = 2^{46}, power of two
- 72,723,460,248,141 : 68th Fibonacci number
- 73,224,462,646,361 : 197th Markov number
- 74,596,893,730,427 : 51th repfigit
- 77,777,777,777,777 : repdigit

=== 80,000,000,000,000 to 89,999,999,999,999 ===
- 80,902,026,460,669 : 198th Markov number
- 82,561,235,448,866 : 199th Markov number
- 83,400,061,453,514 : number of 54-bead necklaces (turning over is allowed) where complements are equivalent
- 84,973,577,874,916 : number of 53-bead binary necklaces with beads of 2 colors where the colors may be swapped but turning over is not allowed
- 85,349,327,734,485 : number of secondary structures of RNA molecules with 39 nucleotides
- 88,888,888,888,888 : repdigit

=== 90,000,000,000,000 to 99,999,999,999,999 ===
- 90,159,953,477,631 : 41st Woodall number
- 93,139,301,545,921 : 200th Markov number
- 97,295,849,958,669 : 52nd repfigit
- 97,568,760,404,309 : 201st Markov number
- 97,821,761,637,600 : 81st superabundant number
- 99,999,999,999,973 : largest 14-digit prime number
- 99,999,999,999,999 : largest 14-digit number, repdigit, and Kaprekar number

== See also ==
- Long and short scales
- Names of large numbers
- Orders of magnitude (numbers)
- Power of 10
