= 100,000,000,000 =

100000000000
- List of numbers; Integers; ← 10^{0} 10^{1} 10^{2} 10^{3} 10^{4} 10^{5} 10^{6} 10^{7} 10^{8} 10^{9} 10^{10} 10^{11} 10^{12} 10^{13}
- Cardinal: One hundred billion
- Ordinal: One hundred billionth (short scale)
- Factorization: 2^{11}; 5^{11}
- Greek numeral: $\stackrel{\alpha}{\Mu}$
- Roman numeral: X
- Binary: 1011101001000011101101110100000000000_{2}
- Ternary: 100120010011122100020201_{3}
- Senary: 113534523014544_{6}
- Octal: 1351035564000_{8}
- Duodecimal: 1746996A454_{12}
- Hexadecimal: 174876E800_{16}

100,000,000,000 (one hundred billion) is the natural number following 99,999,999,999 and preceding 100,000,000,001.

In scientific notation, it is written as 10^{11}.

== In mathematics ==
100,000,000,000 is an even composite number. It is also a Harshad number, and a happy number.

100,000,000,000 is a power of 10, written as 10^11, or 10^{11}.

== In scaling ==
Visualization of powers of ten from one to 10^{12}

100,000,000,000 can appear in scaling

=== Nature ===
- 10^{11} bacteria per gram of wet content is the standard concentration found in the colon and measured in stool samples.

== In other fields ==
- Deoxyribozymes are able to enhance catalytic rate of chemical reactions up to 100,000,000,000-fold over the uncatalyzed reaction.

== Selected 12-digit numbers (100,000,000,001–999,999,999,999) ==
=== 100,000,000,001 to 199,999,999,999 ===
- 100,000,000,003 = smallest 12-digit prime number.
- 100,000,147,984 = 316228^{2}, the smallest 12-digit square.
- 100,000,404,505 = smallest triangular number with 12 digits and the 447,214th triangular number
- 102,280,151,422 = number of 43-bead binary necklaces with beads of 2 colors where the colors may be swapped but turning over is not allowed
- 107,578,520,350 = 30th Pell number.
- 109,972,410,221 = number of trees with 32 unlabeled nodes
- 127,004,500,762 = number of parallelogram polyominoes with 32 cells.
- 128,367,472,469 = Markov prime
- 134,474,581,374 = number of secondary structures of RNA molecules with 32 nucleotides
- 137,438,691,328 = 7th perfect number.
- 137,438,953,472 = 2^{37}
- 139,355,139,206 = number of signed trees with 20 nodes
- 139,583,862,445 = 55th Fibonacci number.
- 143,367,113,573 = Markov prime
- 145,540,468,640 = number of series-reduced planted trees with 42 nodes
- 168,047,007,728 = number of free 23-ominoes
- 172,765,826,641 = Markov prime
- 186,492,227,801 = self-descriptive number in base 11
- 195,470,831,356 = number of 45-bead necklaces (turning over is allowed) where complements are equivalent
- 198,585,576,189 = only known Descartes number, and odd spoof perfect number. It has 486 divisors.
- 199,911,300,472 = number of 44-bead binary necklaces with beads of 2 colors where the colors may be swapped but turning over is not allowed

=== 200,000,000,000 to 299,999,999,999 ===
- 200,560,490,130 = eleventh primorial
- 208,023,278,209 = 28th Motzkin number.
- 225,851,433,717 = 56th Fibonacci number.
- 247,489,226,192 = number of centered hydrocarbons with 35 carbon atoms
- 252,097,800,623 = 10,000,000,000th prime number
- 255,323,504,932 = logarithmic number.
- 259,717,522,849 = 31st Pell number.
- 292,471,210,647 = highest displayable year on 64-bit computing systems.
- 293,270,987,832 = number of parallelogram polyominoes with 33 cells.

=== 300,000,000,000 to 399,999,999,999 ===
- 300,628,862,480 = number of trees with 33 unlabeled nodes
- 307,272,063,019 = number of series-reduced planted trees with 43 nodes
- 308,457,624,821 = number of prime numbers having thirteen digits
- 311,809,494,089 = Markov prime
- 316,234,143,225 = double factorial of 23
- 321,253,732,800 = superior highly composite number
- 333,333,333,333 = repdigit made of 3s
- 336,908,488,839 = number of secondary structures of RNA molecules with 33 nucleotides
- 343,059,613,650 = Catalan number
- 346,065,536,839 = number of primes under 10^{13}
- 365,435,296,162 = 57th Fibonacci number.
- 382,443,112,538 = number of 46-bead necklaces (turning over is allowed) where complements are equivalent
- 390,937,468,408 = number of 45-bead binary necklaces with beads of 2 colors where the colors may be swapped but turning over is not allowed

=== 400,000,000,000 to 499,999,999,999 ===
- 410,629,766,416 = amount of unique coordinate points on Earth when following the degree, minute, second format. Sum can be found by finding the square of 640,804.

=== 500,000,000,000 to 999,999,999,999 ===
- 500,000,500,000 = sum of first 1,000,000 integers
- 591,286,729,879 = 58th Fibonacci number.
- 593,742,784,829 = 29th Motzkin number.
- 608,981,813,029 = smallest number for which there are more primes up to the number of the form 3k + 1 than of the form 3k + 2.
- 619,737,131,179 = largest number such that every pair of consecutive digits is a distinct prime.
- 627,013,566,048 = 32nd Pell number.
- 649,164,795,179 = number of centered hydrocarbons with 36 carbon atoms
- 649,287,537,982 = number of series-reduced planted trees with 44 nodes
- 654,999,700,403 = number of free 24-ominoes
- 682,076,806,159 = 18th Bell number.
- 695,808,554,300 = number of signed trees with 21 nodes
- 748,607,855,769 = number of 47-bead necklaces (turning over is allowed) where complements are equivalent
- 764,877,836,468 = number of 46-bead binary necklaces with beads of 2 colors where the colors may be swapped but turning over is not allowed
- 823,779,631,721 = number of trees with 34 unlabeled nodes
- 845,139,060,165 = number of secondary structures of RNA molecules with 34 nucleotides
- 918,212,890,625 = 1-automorphic number
- 956,722,026,041 = 59th Fibonacci number.
- 999,999,999,989 = largest 12-digit prime number
