= Alternating factorial =

In mathematics, an alternating factorial is the absolute value of the alternating sum of the first $n$ factorials of positive integers.

This is the same as their sum, with the odd-indexed factorials multiplied by −1 if $n$ is even, and the even-indexed factorials multiplied by −1 if $n$ is odd, resulting in an alternation of signs of the summands (or alternation of addition and subtraction operators, if preferred). To put it algebraically,

$$\operatorname{af}(n) = \sum_{i = 1}^n (-1)^{n - i}i!$$

or with the recurrence relation

$$\operatorname{af}(n) = n! - \operatorname{af}(n - 1)$$

in which $\operatorname{af}(n)$ is 1.

The first few alternating factorials are

1, 1, 5, 19, 101, 619, 4421, 35899, 326981, 3301819, 36614981, 442386619, 5784634181, 81393657019 (sequence A005165 in the OEIS)

For example, the third alternating factorial is 1! – 2! + 3!. The fourth alternating factorial is −1! + 2! − 3! + 4! = 19. Regardless of the parity of $n!$, the last ($n$th) summand, $n!$, is given a positive sign, the $(n-1)$st summand is given a negative sign, and the signs of the lower-indexed summands are alternated accordingly.

Živković (1999) proved that there are only a finite number of alternating factorials that are also prime numbers, since 3612703 divides $\operatorname{af}$(3612702) and therefore divides $\operatorname{af}(n)$ for all $n$ ≥ 3612702. The primes are $\operatorname{af}(n)$ for

$n={}$3, 4, 5, 6, 7, 8, 10, 15, 19, 41, 59, 61, 105, 160, 661, ... (sequence A001272 in the OEIS)

with several higher probable primes that have not been proven prime.
