= 10,000,000,000 =

10000000000
- List of numbers; Integers; ← 10^{0} 10^{1} 10^{2} 10^{3} 10^{4} 10^{5} 10^{6} 10^{7} 10^{8} 10^{9} 10^{10} 10^{11} 10^{12} 10^{13}
- Cardinal: Ten billion
- Ordinal: Ten billionth (short scale)
- Factorization: 2^{10}; 5^{10}
- Greek numeral: $\stackrel{\rho}{\Mu}$
- Roman numeral: X
- Binary: 1001010100000010111110010000000000_{2}
- Ternary: 221210220202122010101_{3}
- Senary: 4332142412144_{6}
- Octal: 112402762000_{8}
- Duodecimal: 1B30B91054_{12}
- Hexadecimal: 2540BE400_{16}

10,000,000,000 (ten billion) is the natural number following 9,999,999,999 and preceding 10,000,000,001.

In scientific notation, it is written as 10^{10}. It can be also written in tetration notation as ^{2}10.

10,000,000,000 is also the fifth power of 100 and also the square of 100,000.

== Selected 11-digit numbers (10,000,000,000–99,999,999,999) ==
=== 10,000,000,000 to 19,999,999,999 ===
- 10,000,000,019 = smallest 11-digit prime number.
- 10,000,020,331 = smallest triangular number with 11 digits and the 141,421st triangular number
- 10,123,457,689 = smallest pandigital prime in base 10.
- 10,314,998,977 = number of parallelogram polyominoes with 29 cells.
- 10,460,362,464 = Leyland number using 3 & 21 (3^{21} + 21^{3})
- 10,480,142,147 = 16th Bell number.
- 11,123,060,678 = number of free 21-ominoes
- 11,874,568,703 = number of partitions of 378 into divisors of 378
- 12,586,269,025 = 50th Fibonacci number.
- 13,409,202,676 = number of 41-bead necklaces (turning over is allowed) where complements are equivalent
- 13,743,921,632 = number of 40-bead binary necklaces with beads of 2 colors where the colors may be swapped but turning over is not allowed
- 13,749,310,575 = double factorial of 21
- 13,800,000,000 = approximate age of the universe in years
- 13,893,615,154 = number of centered hydrocarbons with 32 carbon atoms
- 13,967,553,600 = superior highly composite number, superabundant number
- 14,182,439,040 = smallest 5-perfect number
- 14,499,777,100 – initial number of fifth century xx00 to xx99 containing exactly seventeen prime numbers (14,499,777,100+n, for n = 7, 9, 13, 19, 21, 33, 37, 43, 51, 61, 63, 67, 69, 79, 81, 91, 97)
- 14,830,871,802 = number of trees with 30 unlabeled nodes
- 15,552,771,085 = number of series-reduced planted trees with 39 nodes
- 16,481,146,479 = number of (unordered, unlabeled) rooted trimmed trees with 31 nodes
- 17,171,999,198 = number of partitions of 390 into divisors of 390
- 17,179,869,184 = 131072^{2} = 4^{17} = 2^{34}
- 17,179,870,340 = Leyland number using 2 & 34 (2^{34} + 34^{2})
- 17,179,952,705 = Leyland number using 4 & 17 (4^{17} + 17^{4})
- 17,387,594,880 = position of first occurrence of the string 0123456789 in the decimal expansion of π
- 17,589,157,530 = number of partitions of 288 into divisors of 288
- 18,212,890,625 = 1-automorphic number
- 18,348,340,127 = logarithmic number.
- 18,457,556,052 = 28th Pell number.
- 18,632,325,319 = 33rd Wedderburn–Etherington number.
- 19,577,194,573 = Markov prime
- 19,606,122,418 = number of partitions of 384 into divisors of 384
- 19,847,520,789 = number of uniform rooted trees with 29 nodes

=== 20,000,000,000 to 29,999,999,999 ===
- 20,365,011,074 = 51st Fibonacci number.
- 21,511,212,261 = number of secondary structures of RNA molecules with 30 nucleotides
- 22,801,763,489 = 1,000,000,000th prime number
- 24,466,267,020 = Catalan number
- 25,209,506,681 = Markov prime
- 25,669,818,476 = 26th Motzkin number.
- 26,179,922,024 = number of 42-bead necklaces (turning over is allowed) where complements are equivalent
- 26,771,144,400 = smallest number divisible by the numbers from 1 to 26 (there is no smaller number divisible by the numbers from 1 to 25 since any number divisible by 2 and 13 must be divisible by 26)
- 26,817,356,776 = number of 41-bead binary necklaces with beads of 2 colors where the colors may be swapped but turning over is not allowed
- 26,990,077,184 = number of partitions of 240 into divisors of 240
- 28,088,787,314 = number of signed trees with 19 nodes
- 28,843,094,837 = number of partitions of 300 into divisors of 300

=== 30,000,000,000 to 39,999,999,999 ===
- 31,381,070,257 = Leyland number using 3 & 22 (3^{22} + 22^{3})
- 32,742,002,341 = number of series-reduced planted trees with 40 nodes
- 32,951,280,099 = 52nd Fibonacci number.
- 33,489,857,205 = number of prime numbers having twelve digits
- 33,823,827,452 = number of partially ordered set with 13 unlabeled elements
- 34,359,739,593 = Leyland number using 2 & 35 (2^{35} + 35^{2})
- 36,201,693,122 = number of centered hydrocarbons with 33 carbon atoms
- 37,607,912,018 = number of primes under 10^{12}

=== 40,000,000,000 to 49,999,999,999 ===
- 40,330,829,030 = number of trees with 31 unlabeled nodes
- 40,849,449,618 = number of (unordered, unlabeled) rooted trimmed trees with 32 nodes
- 43,191,857,688 = number of free 22-ominoes
- 44,208,781,349 = Markov prime
- 44,214,569,100 = 34th Wedderburn–Etherington number.
- 44,560,482,149 = Markov prime, 29th Pell number

=== 50,000,000,000 to 59,999,999,999 ===
- 50,006,393,431 = smallest prime number in base 10 whose expansions is bases 2 to 9 are all valid decimal expansions of (other) primes
- 51,001,180,160 = largest known (and conjectured to be the largest) triperfect number
- 51,141,124,287 = number of 43-bead necklaces (turning over is allowed) where complements are equivalent
- 51,283,502,951 = number k such that the sum of the squares of the first k primes is divisible by k.
- 52,308,750,878 = number of uniform rooted trees with 30 nodes
- 52,357,746,896 = number of 42-bead binary necklaces with beads of 2 colors where the colors may be swapped but turning over is not allowed
- 53,316,291,173 = 53rd Fibonacci number.
- 53,745,962,199 = number of secondary structures of RNA molecules with 31 nucleotides
- 55,000,815,222 = number of parallelogram polyominoes with 31 cells.
- 55,420,693,056 = 8th square triangular number.

=== 60,000,000,000 to 69,999,999,999 ===
- 61,871,424,992 = approximate number of planck lengths to amount to one yoctometer, previously the smallest SI unit of length, until the rontometer and quectometer were added in 2022.
- 65,118,683,800 – initial number of sixth century xx00 to xx99 containing exactly seventeen prime numbers (65,118,683,800+n, for n = 3, 7, 9, 13, 37, 43, 49, 57, 63, 67, 79, 81, 87, 91, 93, 97, 99)
- 68,719,476,736 = 262144^{2} = 4096^{3} = 512^{4} = 64^{6} = 16^{9} = 8^{12} = 4^{18} = 2^{36}
- 68,719,478,032 = Leyland number using 2 & 36 (2^{36} + 36^{2})
- 68,719,581,712 = Leyland number using 4 & 18 (4^{18} + 18^{4})
- 68,998,193,212 = number of series-reduced planted trees with 41 nodes

=== 70,000,000,000 to 79,999,999,999 ===
- 73,007,772,802 = 27th Motzkin number.

=== 80,000,000,000 to 89,999,999,999 ===
- 80,313,433,200 = highly composite number, smallest number divisible by the numbers from 1 to 28
- 81,393,657,019 = 14th alternating factorial.
- 81,749,606,400 = double factorial of 22
- 81,787,109,376 = 1-automorphic number
- 82,864,869,804 = 17th Bell number.
- 86,267,571,272 = 54th Fibonacci number.
- 87,178,291,199 = factorial prime
- 87,178,291,200 = 14!

=== 90,000,000,000 to 99,999,999,999 ===
- 91,482,563,640 = Catalan number
- 93,000,000,000 = approximate diameter of the observable universe in light-years.
- 94,143,190,994 = Leyland number using 3 & 23 (3^{23} + 23^{3})
- 94,550,040,702 = number of centered hydrocarbons with 34 carbon atoms
- 99,957,747,388 = number of 44-bead necklaces (turning over is allowed) where complements are equivalent
- 99,999,999,977 = largest 11-digit prime number
- 99,999,999,999 = largest 11-digit number, repdigit, and Kaprekar number

=== Prime numbers ===
There are 455,052,511 prime numbers below 10,000,000,000.
