= 16843 (number) =

| ← 16842 | 16843 | 16844 → |
- List of numbers; Integers; ← 0 10k 20k 30k 40k 50k 60k 70k 80k 90k →
- Cardinal: sixteen thousand eight hundred forty-three
- Ordinal: 16843rd (sixteen thousand eight hundred forty-third)
- Factorization: prime
- Divisors: 1, 16843
- Greek numeral: $\stackrel{\alpha}{\Mu}$͵Ϛωμγ´
- Roman numeral: X̅V̅MDCCCXLIII, x̅v̅mdcccxliii
- Binary: 100000111001011_{2}
- Ternary: 212002211_{3}
- Senary: 205551_{6}
- Octal: 40713_{8}
- Duodecimal: 98B7_{12}
- Hexadecimal: 41CB_{16}

16843 (sixteen thousand eight hundred [and] forty-three) is the natural number following 16842 and preceding 16844.

== In mathematics ==
16843 is the 1944th prime number. It is also a prime such that the next n successive differences are identical.

For $p < 30000$, one of the irregular pairs of various forms is $p = 16843$ for $(p, p - 3)$.

=== Wolstenholme prime ===
16843 is the first and smallest of only two known Wolstenholme primes, the other which is 2124679. In the latest search for Wolstenholme primes in 2007, the authors Richard J. McIntosh and Eric L. Roettger stated that there are no more existence of Wolstenholme primes less than 10^9.
