= 20990 =

← 20989	20990	20991 →
- List of numbers; Integers; ← 0 10k 20k 30k 40k 50k 60k 70k 80k 90k →
- Cardinal: twenty thousand nine hundred ninety
- Ordinal: 20990th (twenty thousand nine hundred ninetieth)
- Factorization: 2 × 5 × 2099
- Divisors: 1, 2, 5, 10, 2099, 4198, 10495, 20990, 20990
- Greek numeral: $\stackrel{\beta}{\Mu}$͵ϡϟ´
- Roman numeral: X̅X̅CMXC, x̅x̅cmxc
- Binary: 101000111111110_{2}
- Ternary: 1001210102_{3}
- Senary: 241102_{6}
- Octal: 50776_{8}
- Duodecimal: 10192_{12}
- Hexadecimal: 51FE_{16}

20990 (twenty thousand nine hundred [and] ninety) is the natural number following 20989 and preceding 20991.

== In mathematics ==
The prime factorization of 20990 is 2 × 5 × 2099, meaning that 20990 is a composite number. It is also a deficient number, since the divisors of 20990 (excluding itself) sum up to 16810, which is less than 20990.

== Uninteresting number ==
As of 2026, 20990 is the smallest uninteresting number, since it doesn't appear in the On-line Encyclopedia of Integer Sequences. In July 2009, 11630 was the smallest uninteresting number for the same reason, until a new integer sequence contained 11630. Being the smallest uninteresting number is considered interesting. 20067 was the previous smallest uninteresting number.
