= 12,000 (number) =

← 11999	12000	12001 →
- List of numbers; Integers; ← 0 10k 20k 30k 40k 50k 60k 70k 80k 90k →
- Cardinal: twelve thousand
- Ordinal: 12000th (twelve thousandth)
- Factorization: 2^{5} × 3 × 5^{3}
- Divisors: 1, 2, 3, 4, 5, 6, 8, 10, 12, 15, 16, 20, 24, 25, 30, 32, 40, 48, 50, 60, 75, 80, 96, 100, 120, 125, 150, 160, 200, 240, 250, 300, 375, 400, 480, 500, 600, 750, 800, 1000, 1200, 1500, 2000, 2400, 3000, 4000, 6000, 12000
- Greek numeral: $\stackrel{\alpha}{\Mu}$͵β´
- Roman numeral: C̅X̅L̅I̅V̅ or C̅X̅L̅MMMM
- Binary: 10111011100000_{2}
- Ternary: 121110110_{3}
- Senary: 131320_{6}
- Octal: 27340_{8}
- Duodecimal: 6B40_{12}
- Hexadecimal: 2EE0_{16}

12000 (twelve thousand) is the natural number following 11999 and preceding 12001. It has significance in Christianity and Hinduism.

== In mathematics ==
12000 is an odd, composite number, which has 48 divisors. (Note: Which are: 1, 2, 3, 4, 5, 6, 8, 10, 12, 15, 16, 20, 24, 25, 30, 32, 40, 48, 50, 60, 75, 80, 96, 100, 120, 125, 150, 160, 200, 240, 250, 300, 375, 400, 480, 500, 600, 750, 800, 1000, 1200, 1500, 2000, 2400, 3000, 4000, 6000, 12000) It is also a regular number, a 3 times decagonal number, a number in base -3, and a number of the Hamiltonian cycles in the rook graph $K_n X K_m$.

== In Religion ==
=== In Christianity ===
In Christianity, the number 12,000 appears 25 times in the Bible, in one of the verses, it appears twelve times in Revelation 7:5–8, which quotes:

12,000 from the tribe of Judah were sealed,
12,000 from the tribe of Reuben,
12,000 from the tribe of Gad,
12,000 from the tribe of Asher,
12,000 from the tribe of Naphtali,
12,000 from the tribe of Manasseh,
12,000 from the tribe of Simeon,
12,000 from the tribe of Levi,
12,000 from the tribe of Issachar,
12,000 from the tribe of Zebulun,
12,000 from the tribe of Joseph,
12,000 from the tribe of Benjamin were sealed.

=== In Hinduism ===
In Hinduism, 12000 divine years correspond to a cycle of Maha Yuga, that is to represent 4320000 years, which is one divine year during 360 years.

== In other fields ==
The average distance from the Earth to the Sun is approximately 12000 times the terrestrial diameter.

== See also ==
- 144,000
