= 64,079 =

← 64078	64079	64080 →
- List of numbers; Integers; ← 0 10k 20k 30k 40k 50k 60k 70k 80k 90k →
- Cardinal: sixty-four thousand seventy-nine
- Ordinal: 64079th (sixty-four thousand seventy-ninth)
- Factorization: 139 × 461
- Divisors: 1, 139, 461, 64079
- Greek numeral: $\stackrel{\digamma}{\Mu}$͵δοθ´
- Roman numeral: L̅X̅I̅V̅LXXIX, l̅x̅i̅v̅lxxix
- Binary: 1111101001001111_{2}
- Ternary: 10020220022_{3}
- Senary: 1212355_{6}
- Octal: 175117_{8}
- Duodecimal: 310BB_{12}
- Hexadecimal: FA4F_{16}

64079 (sixty-four thousand [and] seventy-nine) is the natural number following 64078, and preceding 64080.

== In mathematics ==
64079 is the twenty-third Lucas number and is thus often written as L_{23}. It is significant for being the first Lucas number L_{n} where n is prime that is itself not prime, after L_{3}=4. It is also a Lucas pseudoprime.
