= 65,537 =

← 65536	65537	65538 →
- List of numbers; Integers; ← 0 10k 20k 30k 40k 50k 60k 70k 80k 90k →
- Cardinal: sixty-five thousand five hundred thirty-seven
- Ordinal: 65537th (sixty-five thousand five hundred thirty-seventh)
- Factorization: prime
- Prime: 6,543rd
- Greek numeral: $\stackrel{\digamma}{\Mu}$͵εφλζ´
- Roman numeral: L̅X̅V̅DXXXVII, l̅x̅v̅dxxxvii
- Binary: 10000000000000001_{2}
- Ternary: 10022220022_{3}
- Senary: 1223225_{6}
- Octal: 200001_{8}
- Duodecimal: 31B15_{12}
- Hexadecimal: 10001_{16}

Construction of a regular 65537-gon. See constructible polygon.

65537 (sixty-five thousand five hundred [and] thirty-seven) is the natural number and integer following 65536 and preceding 65538.

== In mathematics ==
65537 is the largest known prime number of the form $2^{2^{n}} +1$ ($n = 4$), and is most likely the last one. Therefore, a regular polygon with 65537 sides is constructible with compass and unmarked straightedge. Johann Gustav Hermes gave the first explicit construction of this polygon. In number theory, primes of this form are known as Fermat primes, named after the mathematician Pierre de Fermat. The only known prime Fermat numbers are

$2^{2^{0}} + 1 = 2^{1} + 1 = 3,$

$2^{2^{1}} + 1= 2^{2} +1 = 5,$

$2^{2^{2}} + 1 = 2^{4} +1 = 17,$

$2^{2^{3}} + 1= 2^{8} + 1= 257,$

$2^{2^{4}} + 1 = 2^{16} + 1 = 65537.$

In 1732, Leonhard Euler found that the next Fermat number is composite:

$2^{2^{5}} + 1 = 2^{32} + 1 = 4294967297 = 641 \times 6700417$

In 1880, Fortuné Landry showed that

$2^{2^{6}} + 1 = 2^{64} + 1 = 274177 \times 67280421310721$

65537 is also the 17th Jacobsthal–Lucas number, and currently the largest known integer n for which the number $10^{n} + 27$ is a probable prime.

== Applications ==
65537 is commonly used as a public exponent in the RSA cryptosystem. Because it is the Fermat number F_{n} = 2^{2^{n}} + 1 with n = 4, the common shorthand is "F_{4}" or "F4". This value was used in RSA mainly for historical reasons; early raw RSA implementations (without proper padding) were vulnerable to very small exponents, while use of high exponents was computationally expensive with no advantage to security (assuming proper padding).

65537 is also used as the modulus in some Lehmer random number generators, such as the one used by ZX Spectrum, which ensures that any seed value will be coprime to it (vital to ensure the maximum period) while also allowing efficient reduction by the modulus using a bit shift and subtract.
