= 16,807 =

← 16806	16807	16808 →
- List of numbers; Integers; ← 0 10k 20k 30k 40k 50k 60k 70k 80k 90k →
- Cardinal: sixteen thousand eight hundred seven
- Ordinal: 16807th (sixteen thousand eight hundred seventh)
- Factorization: 7^{5}
- Greek numeral: $\stackrel{\alpha}{\Mu}$͵Ϛωζ´
- Roman numeral: X̅V̅MDCCCVII, x̅v̅mdcccvii
- Binary: 100000110100111_{2}
- Ternary: 212001111_{3}
- Senary: 205451_{6}
- Octal: 40647_{8}
- Duodecimal: 9887_{12}
- Hexadecimal: 41A7_{16}

16807 is the natural number following 16806 and preceding 16808.

== In mathematics ==
As a number of the form $n^{n-2}$ (16807 = 7^{5}), it can be applied in Cayley's formula to count the number of trees with seven labeled nodes.

The powers of seven, including this one, feature in problem 79 from the Rhind Mathematical Papyrus, from ancient Egypt circa 1650 BC. It resembles the modern English riddle As I was going to St Ives, which compounds powers of seven up to $7^4$ kittens, but reaching one more step, $7^5=16807$ hekat (an ancient Egyptian unit of measurement for grain). Another puzzle of the same type, with 16807 knives, occurs in Fibonacci's Liber Abaci.

== In other fields ==
- Several authors have suggested a Lehmer random number generator:

$$X_{k+1} = 16807 \cdot X_k~~\bmod~~2147483647$$
