= 65,536 =

← 65535	65536	65537 →
- List of numbers; Integers; ← 0 10k 20k 30k 40k 50k 60k 70k 80k 90k →
- Cardinal: sixty-five thousand five hundred thirty-six
- Ordinal: 65536th (sixty-five thousand five hundred thirty-sixth)
- Factorization: 2^{16}
- Divisors: 1, 2, 4, 8, 16, 32, 64, 128, 256, 512, 1024, 2048, 4096, 8192, 16384, 32768, 65536
- Greek numeral: $\stackrel{\digamma}{\Mu}$͵εφλϚ´
- Roman numeral: L̅X̅V̅DXXXVI, l̅x̅v̅dxxxvi
- Binary: 10000000000000000_{2}
- Ternary: 10022220021_{3}
- Senary: 1223224_{6}
- Octal: 200000_{8}
- Duodecimal: 31B14_{12}
- Hexadecimal: 10000_{16}

65536 is the natural number following 65535 and preceding 65537.

65536 is a power of two: $2^{16}$ (2 to the 16th power).

65536 is the smallest number with exactly 17 divisors (but there are smaller numbers with more than 17 divisors; e.g., 180 has 18 divisors) (sequence A005179 in the OEIS).

The preceding power of 2 from 65,536 is 32,768

The following power of 2 from 65,536 is 131,072

256×256 grid with 65536 squares

== In mathematics ==
65536 is $2^{2^{2^2}}$, so in tetration notation 65536 is 4 2.

When expressed using Knuth's up-arrow notation, 65536 is $2 \uparrow 16$, which is equal to $2 \uparrow 2 \uparrow 2 \uparrow 2$, which is equivalent to $2 \uparrow\uparrow 4$ or $2 \uparrow\uparrow\uparrow 3$.

As $^{2}2$ is also equal to 4, or $2 \uparrow \uparrow 2 = 4$, $^{4}2$ can thus be written as $^{^{2}2}2$, or $2 \uparrow \uparrow (2 \uparrow \uparrow 2)$, or as the pentation $2[5]3$ (hyperoperation notation).

65536 is a superperfect number – a number such that σ(σ(n)) = 2n.

A 16-bit number can distinguish 65536 different possibilities. For example, unsigned binary notation exhausts all possible 16-bit codes in uniquely identifying the numbers 0 to 65535. In this scheme, 65536 is the least natural number that can not be represented with 16 bits. Conversely, it is the "first" or smallest positive integer that requires 17 bits.

65536 is the only power of 2 less than 2^{31000} that does not contain the digits 1, 2, 4, or 8 in its decimal representation.

The sum of the unitary divisors of 65536 is prime (1 + 65536 = 65537, which is prime).

65536 is an untouchable number.

== In computing ==
65,536 (2^{16}) is the number of different values representable in a number of 16 binary digits (or bits), also known as an unsigned short integer in many computer programming systems.

- A 65,536-bit integer can represent up to 2^{65,536} (2.00352993...×10^{19,728}) values.
- 65,536 is the number of characters in the original Unicode, and currently in a Unicode plane.

This number is a limit in many common hardware and software implementations, some examples of which are:

- The Motorola 68000 family, x86 architecture, and other computing platforms have a word size of 16 bits, representing 65536 possible values. (32- or 64-bit operations are supported equally or better in modern microprocessors.)
- Many modern CPUs allow a memory page size of 64KiB (65536 bytes) to be configured in their memory-management hardware.
- The default buffer size of a Unix pipeline is 64KiB (65536 bytes).
- 65536 is the maximum number of spreadsheet rows supported by Excel 97, Excel 2000, Excel 2002 and Excel 2003. Text files that are larger than 65536 rows cannot be imported to these versions of Excel. (Excel 2007, 2010 and 2013 support 1,048,576 rows (2^{20})).
- A 16-bit microprocessor chip can directly access 65536 memory addresses, and the 16-bit highcolor graphics standard supports a color palette of 65536 different colors.
- The maximum number of methods allowed in a single dex file Android application is 65536.
- The limit for the amount of code in bytes for a non-native, non-abstract method in Java.
- The number of available ports to combine with a network address to create a network socket.
- The maximum character limit for one message in WhatsApp is 65536.
