= 20,067 =

← 20066	20067	20068 →
- List of numbers; Integers; ← 0 10k 20k 30k 40k 50k 60k 70k 80k 90k →
- Cardinal: twenty thousand sixty-seven
- Ordinal: 20067th (twenty thousand sixty-seventh)
- Factorization: 3 × 6689
- Divisors: 1, 3, 6689, 20067
- Greek numeral: $\stackrel{\beta}{\Mu}$͵ξζ´
- Roman numeral: X̅X̅LXVII, x̅x̅lxvii
- Binary: 100111001100011_{2}
- Ternary: 1000112020_{3}
- Senary: 232523_{6}
- Octal: 47143_{8}
- Duodecimal: B743_{12}
- Hexadecimal: 4E63_{16}

20,067 (twenty thousand [and] sixty-seven) is the natural number following 20,066 and preceding 20,068.

== In mathematics ==
The prime factorization of 20067 is 3 * 6689, meaning that 20067 is a composite number with 4 divisors being 1, 3, 6689, and 20067. It is a deficient number, because the sum of the divisors (excluding 20067 itself) is 6693, which is less than 20067.

=== Boring number ===
In 2023, 20067 was noted for being a boring number, since it did not appear in the On-Line Encyclopedia of Integer Sequences. At the time it was the smallest such number, making it a candidate to resolve the Interesting number paradox.

Now the OEIS sequence A379570 contains 20067 as the number of 5-digit numbers that have exactly 8 divisors.
