= 65,535 =

← 65534	65535	65536 →
- List of numbers; Integers; ← 0 10k 20k 30k 40k 50k 60k 70k 80k 90k →
- Cardinal: sixty-five thousand five hundred thirty-five
- Ordinal: 65535th (sixty-five thousand five hundred thirty-fifth)
- Factorization: 3 × 5 × 17 × 257
- Divisors: 16 total
- Greek numeral: $\stackrel{\digamma}{\Mu}$͵εφλε´
- Roman numeral: L̅X̅V̅DXXXV, l̅x̅v̅dxxxv
- Binary: 1111111111111111_{2}
- Ternary: 10022220020_{3}
- Senary: 1223223_{6}
- Octal: 177777_{8}
- Duodecimal: 31B13_{12}
- Hexadecimal: FFFF_{16}

65535 is the integer after 65534 and before 65536.

It is the maximum value of an unsigned 16-bit integer.

== In mathematics ==
65535 is the sum of 2^{0} through 2^{15} (2^{0} + 2^{1} + 2^{2} + ... + 2^{15}) and is therefore a repdigit in base 2 (1111111111111111), in base 4 (33333333), and in base 16 (FFFF).

It is the ninth number $n$ whose Euler totient has an aliquot sum that is $n$: $\sigma(\varphi(65535)) = 65535$, and the twenty-eighth perfect totient number equal to the sum of its iterated totients.

65535 is the fifteenth 626-gonal number, the fifth 6555-gonal number, and the third 21846-gonal number.

65535 is the product of the first four Fermat primes: 65535 = (2 + 1)(4 + 1)(16 + 1)(256 + 1). Because of this property, it is possible to construct with compass and straightedge a regular polygon with 65535 sides (see, constructible polygon).

== In computing ==
- 65535 occurs frequently in the field of computing because it is $2^{16} - 1$ (one less than 2 to the 16th power), which is the highest number that can be represented by an unsigned 16-bit binary number. Some computer programming environments may have predefined constant values representing 65535, with names like MAX_UNSIGNED_SHORT.
- In older computers with processors having a 16-bit address bus such as the MOS Technology 6502 popular in the 1970s and the Zilog Z80, 65535 (FFFF_{16}) is the highest addressable memory location, with 0 (0000_{16}) being the lowest. Such processors thus support at most 64 KiB of total byte-addressable memory.
- In Internet protocols, 65535 is also the number of TCP and UDP ports available for use, since port 0 is reserved.
- In some implementations of Tiny BASIC, entering a command that divides any number by zero will return 65535. (Note: In Altar 4k BASIC (1975), Tiny BASIC Extended (1976), 6800 Tiny BASIC (1976), and MICRO BASIC 1.3 (1976).)
- In Microsoft Word 2011 for Mac, 65535 is the highest line number that will be displayed.
- In HTML, 65535 is the decimal value of the web color Aqua (#00FFFF) .
- in Dragon Quest 1, this is the number of experience points needed to reach the maximum character level of 30.
- In Fallout 4, level 65535 is the last possible level that the player can reach as there is no level cap. Gaining one more after this causes the game to crash.

== See also ==
- 4,294,967,295
- 255 (number)
- 16-bit computing
