= 10,000 =

← 9999	10000	10001 →
- List of numbers; Integers; ← 0 10k 20k 30k 40k 50k 60k 70k 80k 90k →
- Cardinal: ten thousand
- Ordinal: 10000th (ten thousandth)
- Numeral system: decamillesimal
- Factorization: 2^{4} × 5^{4}
- Divisors: 25 total
- Greek numeral: $\stackrel{\alpha}{\Mu}$
- Roman numeral: X̅, x̅
- Unicode symbol(s): X̅, ↂ
- Greek prefix: myria-
- Latin prefix: decamilli-
- Binary: 10011100010000_{2}
- Ternary: 111201101_{3}
- Senary: 114144_{6}
- Octal: 23420_{8}
- Duodecimal: 5954_{12}
- Hexadecimal: 2710_{16}
- Chinese numeral: 万, 萬
- Armenian: Օ
- Egyptian hieroglyph: 𓂭

10,000 (ten thousand) is the natural number following 9,999 and preceding 10,001.

== Name ==
Many languages have a specific word for this number; in Ancient Greek it is μύριοι (the etymological root of the word myriad in English), in Aramaic ܪܒܘܬܐ, in Hebrew רבבה [revava], in Chinese 萬/万 (Mandarin wàn, Cantonese maan6, Hokkien bān), in Japanese 万/萬 [man], in Khmer ម៉ឺន [meun], in Korean 만/萬 [man], in Russian тьма [t'ma], in Vietnamese vạn, in Sanskrit अयुत [ayuta], in Thai หมื่น [meun], in Malayalam പതിനായിരം [patinayiram], and in Malagasy alina. In many of these languages, it often denotes a very large but indefinite number.

The classical Greeks used letters of the Greek alphabet to represent Greek numerals: they used a capital letter mu (Μ) to represent ten thousand. This Greek root was used in early versions of the metric system in the form of the decimal prefix myria-.

Depending on the country, the number ten thousand is usually written as 10,000 (including in the UK and US), 10.000, or 10 000.

== In mathematics ==
In scientific notation, it is written as 10^{4} or 1 E+4 (equivalently 1 E4) in E notation. It is the square of 100 and the square root of 100,000,000.

The value of a myriad to the power of itself, 10000^{10000} = 10^{40000}.

It has a reduced totient of 500, and a totient of 4,000, with a total of 16 integers having a totient value of 10,000.

There are a total of 1,229 prime numbers less than ten thousand, a count that is itself prime.

A myriagon is a polygon with ten thousand edges and a total of 25 dihedral symmetry groups when including the myriagon itself, alongside 25 cyclic groups as subgroups.

== In science ==
- In astronomy,
  - asteroid Number: 10000 Myriostos, Provisional Designation: 1951 SY, Discovery Date: September 30, 1951, by A. G. Wilson:List of asteroids (9001-10000).
- In climate, Summary of 10000 Years is one of several pages of the Climate Timeline Tool: Exploring Weather & Climate Change Through the Powers of 10 sponsored by the National Climatic Data Center of the National Oceanic & Atmospheric Administration.
- In computing,
  - 65,536 kilobytes in decimal is equal to 10,000 kB in hexadecimal (the equivalent addressing ranges of 0 to 65,535 in decimal are 0 to FFFF in hex).
  - NASA built a 10000-processor Linux computer (it is actually a 10,240-processor) called Columbia.
- In geography,
  - Land of 10000 Lakes is the nickname for the state of Minnesota.
  - Land of 10000 Trails or 10000trails.com is an organization created in 1999 by the TN/KY Lakes Area Coalition and based in West Tennessee and West Kentucky to promote tourism by developing trails in the region.
  - Ten Thousand Islands National Wildlife Refuge is situated in the lower end of the Fakahatchee and Picayune Strands of Big Cypress Swamp and west of Everglades National Park in Florida.
  - Valley of Ten Thousand Smokes in Alaska.
- In physics,
  - Myria- (and myrio-) is an obsolete metric prefix that denoted a factor of 10^{+4}, ten thousand, or 10,000.
  - 10,000 hertz, 10 kilohertz, or 10 kHz of the radio frequency spectrum falls in the very low frequency or VLF band and has a wavelength of 30 kilometres.
  - In orders of magnitude (speed), the speed of a fast neutron is 10000 km/s.
  - In acoustics, 10,000 hertz, 10 kilohertz, or 10 kHz of a sound signal at sea level has a wavelength of about 34 mm.
  - In music, a 10 kilohertz sound is a E♭_{9} in the A440 pitch standard, a bit more than an octave higher in pitch than the highest note on a standard piano.

== In time ==
- 10000 BC, 10000 BCE, or 10th millennium BC.
- 10000-year clock or the Clock of the Long Now is a mechanical clock designed to keep time for 10000 years.

== In the arts ==
=== Visual media ===
- 10,000 Black Men Named George, a TV series (2002)
- The Phantom from 10,000 Leagues, a monster film (1956)
- Vietnam: The Ten Thousand Day War, a miniseries (1980)

=== Bands ===
- 10,000 Maniacs, an American rock band
- 10,000 Promises., a J-pop group

=== Albums ===
- 10,000 Days, by Tool (2006)
- 10,000 Hz Legend, by Air (2001)
- 10,000 Reasons (album) by Matt Redman (2013)
- 10,000 Gecs by 100 gecs (2023)
- Ten Thousand Fists, by Disturbed (2005)

=== Songs ===
- "Ten Thousand Men of Harvard", fight song of Harvard University
- "10,000 Reasons (Bless the Lord)" by Matt Redman (2013)
- "Ten Thousand Strong" by Iced Earth (2007)

== In other fields ==
- In currency,
  - A version of Iraq's 10,000 dinar banknote has Abu Ali Hasan Ibn al-Haitham (also known as Alhazen) on the front, and a later issue has sculptor Jawad Saleem's Freedom Monument in Baghdad on the front. Both notes have an image of Mosul's al-Hadba' Minaret on the back. The first issue had an image of former Iraqi president Saddam Hussein and the Spiral Minaret - Al-Minārat Al-Malwiyyah in Samarra.
  - the Japanese ¥10,000 banknote depicts Fukuzawa Yukichi.
  - Kazakhstan's 10,000₸ banknote.
  - the Lebanese £L10,000 banknote depicts Beirut's Martyrs' Square.
  - Myanmar's (Burma's) Ks.10,000/- banknote.
  - the U.S. $10,000 note depicts a picture of Salmon P. Chase.
- In distances,
  - 10 km, 10,000 m, or 1 E+4 m is equal to:
    - 1 Scandinavian mil.
    - about 6.2137 English miles.
    - side of square with area 100 km^{2}.
    - radius of a circle with area 100 π km^{2} ≈ 314.159 km^{2}.
- In finance, on March 29, 1999, the Dow Jones Industrial Average closed at 10006.78, which was the first time the index closed above the 10,000 mark.
- In futurology, Stewart Brand in Visions of the Future: The 10,000-Year Library proposes a museum built around a 10,000-year clock as an idea for assuring that vital information survives future crashes of civilizations.
- In games,
  - Ten Thousand is one name of a dice game called farkle.
- In game shows, The $10,000 Pyramid ran on television from 1973 to 1974.
- In history,
  - Army of 10,000 Mississippi American Civil War military unit, 1861–1862.
  - The Army of the Ten Thousand were a group of Ancient Greek mercenaries who marched against Artaxerxes II of Persia.
  - The Persian Immortals were also called the Ten Thousand or 10,000 Immortals, so named because their Number of 10,000 was immediately re-established after every loss.
  - The 10,000 Day War: Vietnam by Michael Maclear ISBN 0-312-79094-5 also alternate titles The ten thousand day war: Vietnam, 1945–1975 (10,000 days is 27.4 years).
  - Tomb of Ten Thousand Soldiers – defeat of the Tang dynasty army of China in the Nanzhao kingdom in 751.
  - In Islamic history, 10,000 is the Number of besieging forces led by Muhammad's adversary, Abu Sufyan, during the Battle of the Trench.
  - 10,000 is the number of Muhammad's soldiers during the conquest of Mecca.
- In language,
  - the Chinese, Japanese, Korean, and Vietnamese phrase live for ten thousand years was used to bless emperors in East Asia.
  - Μύριοι is an Ancient Greek name for 10.000 taken into the modern European languages as 'myriad' (see above). Hebrew, Chinese, Japanese, and Korean have words with the same meaning.
- In literature,
  - Man'yōshū (万葉集 Man'yōshū, Collection of Ten Thousand Leaves) is the oldest existing, and most highly revered, collection of Japanese poetry.
  - Ten Thousand a Year 1839 by Samuel Warren.
  - Ten Thousand a Year 1883?. A drama in three acts. Adapted from the celebrated novel of the same name, by the author of the Diary of a Physician, and arranged for the stage by Richard Brinsley Peake.
  - Anabasis, by the Greek writer Xenophon (431–360 B.C.), about the Army of the Ten Thousand – Greek mercenaries taking part in the expedition of Cyrus the Younger, a Persian prince, against his brother, King Artaxerxes II.
  - The Ten Thousand: A Novel of Ancient Greece by Michael Curtis Ford. 2001. ISBN 0-312-26946-3 Historic fiction about the Army of the Ten Thousand.
  - The World of the Ten Thousand Things: Poems 1980–1990 by Charles Wright ISBN 0-374-29293-0 ISBN 0-374-52326-6.
  - Ten Thousand Lovers by Edeet Ravel ISBN 0-06-056562-4.
- In philosophy, Lao Zi writes about ten thousand things in the Tao Te Ching. In Taoism, the "10,000 Things" is a term meaning all of phenomenal reality.
- In piphilology, ten thousand is the current world record for the Number of digits of pi memorized by a human being.
- In psychology, Ten Thousand Dreams Interpreted, or what's in a dream: a scientific and practical, by Miller, Gustavus Hindman (1857–1929). Project Gutenberg.
- In religion,
  - The Bible,
    - has 52 references to ten thousand in the King James Version.
    - Revelation 5:11 And I beheld, and I heard the voice of many angels round about the throne and the beasts and the elders: and the number of them was ten thousand times ten thousand, and thousands of thousands.
  - hymn, Ten thousand times ten thousand.
  - The Ten thousand martyrs.
- In software,
  - The Year 10,000 problem is the collective name for all potential software bugs that will emerge as the need to express years with five digits arises.
- In sports,
  - In athletics, 10,000 meters, 10 kilometers, 10 km, or 10K (6.2 miles) is the final standard track event in a long-distance track event and a distance in other racing events such as running, cycling, and skiing.
  - In bicycle racing, annual Tour of 10,000 Lakes Stage Race in Minneapolis.
  - In baseball, on July 15, 2007, the Philadelphia Phillies became the first team in American professional sports history to lose 10,000 games.

== Selected numbers in the range 10001-19999 ==
=== 10001 to 10999 ===
- 10001 = strobogrammatic number
- 10006 = number of unlabelled distributive lattices with 19 nodes.
- 10007 = smallest five-digit prime number, twin prime with 10009
- 10008 = palindromic in bases 5 (310013_{5}), 22 (KEK_{22}), 28 (CLC_{28}) and 33 (969_{33}) and a Harshad number in bases 2, 3, 4, 5, 6, 7, 8, 10, 13, 14 and 16
- 10009 = twin prime with 10007
- 10018 = centered heptagonal number
- 10080 = 21st highly composite number; number of minutes in a week
- 10101 = strobogrammatic number
- 10111 = palindromic prime in bases 3 (111212111_{3}) and 27 (DND_{27})
- 10143 = number of partitions of 33
- 10176 = smallest (provable) generalized Riesel number in base 10: 10176*10^{n}-1 is always divisible by one of the prime numbers {7, 11, 13, 37}
- 10201 = 101^{2}, palindromic square (in the decimal system)
- 10206 = pentagonal pyramidal number
- 10223 = sixth last number to be eliminated (in 2016) by Seventeen or Bust (now a sub-project of PrimeGrid) in the Sierpiński problem
- 10239 = Woodall number
- 10252 = Padovan number
- 10267 = cuban prime
- 10289 = highly cototient number
- 10301 = palindromic prime in bases 10 (10301_{10}), 27 (E3E_{27}), 30 (BDB_{30}) and 44 (5E5_{44})
- 10333 = star prime, palindromic in bases 9 (15151_{9}), 31 (ANA_{31}) and 35 (8F8_{35})
- 10368 = 3-smooth number (2^{7}×3^{4})
- 10395 = double factorial of 11
- 10416 = square pyramidal number
- 10425 = octahedral number
- 10430 = weird number
- 10433 = palindromic prime in base 44 (5H5_{44})
- 10440 = 144th triangular number
- 10499 = twin prime with 10501
- 10500 = Harshad number in bases 2, 3, 4, 6, 7, 8, 9, 10, 11, 15 and 16
- 10501 = palindromic prime in bases 10 (10501_{10}) and 58 (373_{58})
- 10512 = Harshad number in bases 2, 3, 4, 5, 7, 8, 9, 10, 13 and 16
- 10538 = 10538 Overture is a hit single by Electric Light Orchestra
- 10560 = Harshad number in bases 2, 3, 4, 5, 6, 8, 9, 10, 11, 12, 13, 14 and 16
- 10570 = weird number
- 10585 = Carmichael number
- 10601 = palindromic prime in bases 10 (10601_{10}) and 30 (BNB_{30})
- 10609 = 103^{2}, tribonacci number
- 10631 = palindromic prime in base 30 (BOB_{30})
- 10646 = ISO 10646 is the standard for Unicode
- 10648 = 22^{3}, the smallest 5-digit cube
- 10660 = tetrahedral number
- 10671 = tetranacci number
- 10709 = highly cototient number
- 10744 = amicable number with 10856
- 10752 = the second 16-bit word of a TIFF file if the byte order marker is misunderstood
- 10792 = weird number
- 10794 = number of terms of Leibniz formula for pi before "3.1415" shows up for the first time
- 10800 = number of bricks used for the uttaravedi in the Agnicayana ritual
- 10801 = strobogrammatic number
- 10837 = star prime
- 10856 = amicable number with 10744
- 10905 = Wedderburn–Etherington number
- 10919 = highly cototient number
- 10920 = sparsely totient number
- 10922 = repdigit in base 4 (2222222_{4}), and palindromic in base 8 (25252_{8})
- 10946 = Fibonacci number, Markov number
- 10958 = the smallest positive integer that cannot be represented by an equation using increasing order of integers from 1 to 9 and basic arithmetic operations
- 10981 = number of reduced trees with 22 nodes
- 10990 = weird number

=== 11000 to 11999 ===
- 11011 = strobogrammatic number
- 11025 = 105^{2}, the sum of the first 14 positive integer cubes
- 11083 = palindromic prime in 2 consecutive bases: 23 (KLK_{23}) and 24 (J5J_{24})
- 11111 = strobogrammatic number
- 11297 = number of planar partitions of 16
- 11298 = Riordan number
- 11311 = palindromic prime in decimal
- 11340 = Harshad number in bases 2, 3, 4, 5, 6, 7, 8, 9, 10, 11, 12, 13, 15 and 16
- 11353 = star prime
- 11368 = pentagonal pyramidal number
- 11410 = weird number
- 11411 = palindromic prime in decimal
- 11424 = Harshad number in bases 3, 5, 6, 7, 8, 9, 10, 11, 12, 13, 15 and 16
- 11440 = square pyramidal number
- 11480 = tetrahedral number
- 11520 = highly totient number
- 11549 = highly cototient number
- 11550 = sparsely totient number
- 11574 = approximate number of days in a billion seconds
- 11593 = smallest prime to start a run of nine consecutive primes of the form 4k + 1
- 11605 = smallest integer to start a run of five consecutive integers with the same number of divisors
- 11664 = 3-smooth number (2^{4}×3^{6}).
- 11690 = weird number
- 11717 = twin prime with 11719
- 11719 = cuban prime, twin prime with 11717
- 11726 = octahedral number
- 11781 = triangular number, hexagonal number, octagonal number, and also 58-gonal, 216-gonal, 329-gonal, 787-gonal and 3928-gonal number
- 11811 = strobogrammatic number
- 11826 = smallest number whose square is pandigital without zeros
- 11842 = palindromic in bases 3 (121020121_{3}), 27 (G6G_{27}) and 34 (A8A_{34})
- 11953 = palindromic prime in bases 7 (46564_{7}) and 30 (D8D_{30})
- 11970 = sparsely totient number

=== 12000 to 12999 ===
- 12000 = 12,000 of each of the twelve tribes of Israel made up the 144,000 servants of God who were 'sealed' according to the Book of Revelation in the New Testament
- 12048 = number of non-isomorphic set-systems of weight 12
- 12097 = cuban prime
- 12101 = Friedman prime
- 12107 = Friedman prime
- 12109 = Friedman prime
- 12110 = weird number
- 12167 = 23^{3}
- 12172 = number of triangle-free graphs on 10 vertices
- 12180 = sparsely totient number
- 12198 = semi-meandric number
- 12251 = number of primes $\leq 2^{17}$
- 12285 = amicable number with 14595
- 12287 = Thabit number
- 12288 = 3-smooth number (2^{12}×3).
- 12289 = Proth prime, Pierpont prime
- 12310 = number of partitions of 34
- 12321 = 111^{2}, Demlo number, palindromic square
- 12341 = tetrahedral number
- 12390 = sparsely totient number
- 12407 = cited on QI as the smallest uninteresting positive integer regarding arithmetical mathematics (Note: On the basis that it did not then (November 2011) appear in Sloane's On-Line Encyclopedia of Integer Sequences)
- 12421 = palindromic prime
- 12496 = smallest sociable number
- 12500 = 2^{2}×5^{5}
- 12529 = square pyramidal number
- 12530 = weird number
- 12542 = there is a match puzzle called MOST + MOST = TOKYO, where each letter represents a digit. When one solves the puzzle, TOKYO = 12542, as 6271 + 6271 = 12542
- 12670 = weird number
- 12721 = palindromic prime
- 12726 = Ruth–Aaron pair
- 12758 = most significant Number that cannot be expressed as the sum of distinct cubes
- 12765 = Finnish internet meme; the code accompanying no-prize caps in a Coca-Cola bottle top prize contest. Often spelled out yksi – kaksi – seitsemän – kuusi – viisi, ei voittoa, "one – two – seven – six – five, no prize".
- 12769 = 113^{2}, palindromic in base 3
- 12821 = palindromic prime

=== 13000 to 13999 ===
- 13122 = 3-smooth number (2×3^{8}).
- 13131 = octahedral number
- 13244 = tetrahedral number
- 13267 = cuban prime
- 13331 = palindromic prime
- 13370 = weird number
- 13510 = weird number
- 13579 = contains the first 5 odd numbers in ascending order
- 13581 = Padovan number
- 13648 = number of 20-bead necklaces (turning over is allowed) where complements are equivalent
- 13649 = highly cototient number
- 13669 = cuban prime
- 13685 = square pyramidal number
- 13790 = weird number
- 13792 = largest number that is not a sum of 16 fourth powers
- 13798 = number of 19-bead binary necklaces with beads of 2 colors where the colors may be swapped but turning over is not allowed
- 13820 = meandric number, open meandric number
- 13824 = 24^{3}
- 13831 = palindromic prime
- 13859 = highly cototient number
- 13860 = Pell number, sparsely totient number
- 13930 = weird number
- 13931 = palindromic prime
- 13950 = pentagonal pyramidal number

=== 14000 to 14999 ===
- 14190 = tetrahedral number
- 14200 = number of n-Queens Problem solutions for n – 12
- 14264 = sociable number
- 14280 = sparsely totient number
- 14288 = sociable number
- 14316 = sociable number
- 14341 = palindromic prime
- 14400 = 120^{2}, the sum of the first 15 positive integers cubes
- 14490 = sparsely totient number
- 14536 = sociable number
- 14595 = amicable number with 12285
- 14641 = 121^{2} = 11^{4}, palindromic square (base 10)
- 14644 = octahedral number
- 14701 = Markov number
- 14741 = palindromic prime
- 14770 = weird number
- 14883 = number of partitions of 35
- 14884 = 122^{2}, palindromic square in base 11
- 14910 = square pyramidal number

=== 15000 to 15999 ===
- 15015 = smallest odd and square-free abundant number
- 15120 = 22nd highly composite number; smallest number with exactly 80 factors
- 15180 = tetrahedral number
- 15329 = highly cototient number
- 15376 = 124^{2}, pentagonal pyramidal number
- 15387 = Zeisel number
- 15451 = palindromic prime
- 15472 = sociable number
- 15511 = Motzkin prime
- 15539 = highly cototient number
- 15551 = palindromic prime
- 15552 = 3-smooth number (2^{6}×3^{5})
- 15610 = weird number
- 15625 = 125^{2} = 25^{3} = 5^{6}
- 15629 = Friedman prime
- 15640 = initial number of only four-, five-, or six-digit century to contain two prime quadruples (in between which lies a record prime gap of 43)
- 15661 = Friedman prime
- 15667 = second nice Friedman prime
- 15679 = Friedman prime
- 15723 = perfect totient number
- 15793 – number of parallelogram polyominoes with 13 cells
- 15841 = Carmichael number
- 15876 = 126^{2}, palindromic square in base 5
- 15890 = weird number
- 15959 = highly cototient number

=== 16000 to 16999 ===
- 16030 = weird number
- 16057 = with 16061, 16063, 16067, 16069, and 16073, the following prime sextuplet after {97, 101, 103, 107, 109, 113}
- 16061 = palindromic prime, It is also the second member of a prime sextuplet set.
- 16063 = third member of a prime sextuplet set
- 16067 = fourth member of a prime sextuplet set
- 16069 = fifth member of a prime sextuplet set
- 16072 = logarithmic number
- 16073 = completes the third prime sextuplet set
- 16091 = strobogrammatic prime
- 16169 = highly cototient number
- 16170 = sparsely totient number
- 16191 = strobogrammatic number
- 16206 = square pyramidal number
- 16269 = octahedral number
- 16310 = weird number
- 16361 = palindromic prime
- 16380 = sparsely totient number
- 16381 = Friedman prime
- 16384 = 128^{2} = 2^{14}, palindromic in base 15
- 16447 = third nice Friedman prime
- 16561 = palindromic prime
- 16580 = Leyland number using 2 & 14 (2^{14} + 14^{2})
- 16587 = betrothed number
- 16590 = sparsely totient number
- 16651 = cuban prime
- 16661 = palindromic prime
- 16730 = weird number
- 16759 = Friedman prime
- 16796 = Catalan number
- 16807 = 7^{5}
- 16843 = smallest Wolstenholme prime
- 16870 = weird number
- 16879 = Friedman prime
- 16891 = strobogrammatic number
- 16896 = pentagonal pyramidal number
- 16999 = number of partially ordered set with 8 unlabeled elements

=== 17000 to 17999 ===
- 17073 = number of free 11-ominoes
- 17163 = the most significant number that is not the sum of the squares of distinct primes
- 17272 = weird number
- 17280 = highly totient number
- 17296 = amicable number with 18416
- 17344 = Kaprekar number
- 17389 = 2000th prime number
- 17471 = palindromic prime
- 17496 = 3-smooth number (2^{3}×3^{7})
- 17570 = weird number
- 17575 = square pyramidal number
- 17576 = 26^{3}, palindromic in base 5
- 17689 = 133^{2}, palindromic in base 11
- 17711 = Fibonacci number
- 17716 = sociable number
- 17849 = highly cototient number
- 17971 = palindromic prime
- 17977 = number of partitions of 36
- 17990 = weird number
- 17991 = Padovan number

=== 18000 to 18999 ===
- 18010 = octahedral number
- 18081 = strobogrammatic number
- 18181 = palindromic prime, strobogrammatic prime
- 18334 = number of planar partitions of 17
- 18410 = weird number
- 18416 = amicable number with 17296
- 18432 = 3-smooth number (2^{11}×3^{2}).
- 18479 = highly cototient number
- 18480 = sparsely totient number
- 18481 = palindromic prime
- 18496 = 136^{2}, the sum of the first 16 positive integers cubes
- 18600:
  - harmonic divisor number
  - initial number of first century xx00 to xx99 containing as few as six prime numbers {18617, 18637, 18661, 18671, 18679, 18691}
- 18620 = harmonic divisor number
- 18785 = Leyland number using 4 & 7 (4^{7} + 7^{4})
- 18800 = initial number of first century xx00 to xx99 containing as few as five prime numbers {18803, 18839, 18859, 18869, 18899}
- 18830 = weird number
- 18881 = strobogrammatic number
- 18970 = weird number

=== 19000 to 19999 ===
- 19019 = square pyramidal number
- 19061 = strobogrammatic number
- 19110 = sparsely totient number
- 19116 = sociable number
- 19141 = unique prime in base 12
- 19161 = strobogrammatic number
- 19302 = number of ways to partition {1,2,3,4,5,6,7} and then partition each cell (block) into subcells
- 19320 = number of trees with 16 unlabeled nodes, sparsely totient number
- 19390 = weird number
- 19391 = palindromic prime
- 19417 = prime sextuplet, along with 19421, 19423, 19427, 19429, and 19433
- 19441 = cuban prime
- 19455 = smallest integer that cannot be expressed as a sum of fewer than 548 ninth powers
- 19513 = tribonacci number
- 19531 = repunit prime in base 5
- 19600 = 140^{2}, tetrahedral number
- 19601/13860 ≈ √2
- 19609 = first prime followed by a prime gap of over fifty
- 19670 = weird number
- 19683 = 27^{3}, 3^{9}. Furthermore, there is a math puzzle regarding the word logic, such that LOGIC = (L+O+G+I+C)^{3}. The solution to this is (1+9+6+8+3) (1+9+6+8+3) (1+9+6+8+3), which is (27)(27)(27), which equals to 19683. This is one of two digits for which this works, although the other solution has O and I are the same digit: 17576, as (1+7+5+7+6) (1+7+5+7+6) (1+7+5+7+6) = (26)(26)(26) = 17576. It is also a perfect totient number.
- 19729 is the number of digits in $2\uparrow\uparrow5$(Tetration)
- 19739 = fourth nice Friedman prime
- 19861 = strobogrammatic prime
- 19871 = octahedral number
- 19891 = palindromic prime
- 19916 = sociable number
- 19927 = cuban prime
- 19991 = palindromic prime

=== Primes ===
There are 1033 prime numbers between 10000 and 20000, a count that is itself prime. It is 196 prime numbers less than the number of primes between 0 and 10000 (1229, also prime).
