= Large number (disambiguation) =

A large number or the largest number are terms that may refer to:

- Large numbers, for notations to exactly specify very large numbers
- Names of large numbers, for the largest numbers with names

== In mathematics and physics ==
- Infinity, a concept which can be used as a largest number in some contexts
- Graham's number, once claimed as the largest number ever used in a serious mathematical proof
- Largest known prime number, for the largest known primes
- Dirac large numbers hypothesis, for cosmology.

== In computing ==
- Arbitrary-precision arithmetic
- The constant 127, 32767, 2147483647, or 9223372036854775807, in a byte, a word of 16, 32, or 64 bits in two's-complement format
- The constant 255, 65535, 4294967295, or 18446744073709551615, in a byte, a word of 16, 32, or 64 bits with no sign bit
- The constant 3.4028235e+38 or 1.7976931348623157e+308, in a word of 32 or 64 bits using the binary IEEE 754-2008 floating-point representation

== See also ==
- Infinitesimal (smallest number)
- Integer (computer science)#Common integral data types - ranges of common integer data types
