= 24K =

24K may refer to:

- 24 karats, as in 24-karat gold
- 24K, an unreleased album by Cuban Link
- 24k, a 1983 album by Band of Joy
- 24K, a 2016 album by Evelina
- 24K+ (band), a Korean K-pop boy band, formerly known as 24K
- The number 24,000
