= 50000 =

50000 may refer to:

- 50000 Quaoar, a dwarf planet in the Solar System
- 50,000, a natural number
