= 20000 =

20000 may refer to:

- 20000 Varuna, a dwarf planet in the Solar System
- 20,000, a natural number
