= Paul Poulet =

Belgian mathematician

Paul Poulet (1887–1946) was a self-taught Belgian mathematician who made several important contributions to number theory, including the discovery of sociable numbers in 1918. He found the 495th amicable pair, 666030256 = 2^{4}.19.331.6619 and 696630544 = 2^{4}.199.331.661, and is also remembered for calculating the pseudoprimes to base two, first up to 50 million in 1926, then up to 100 million in 1938. These are now often called Poulet numbers in his honour (they are also known as Fermatians or Sarrus numbers). In 1925, he published forty-three new multiperfect numbers, including the first two known octo-perfect numbers. His achievements are particularly remarkable given that he worked without the aid of modern computers and calculators.

== Career ==
Poulet published at least two books about his mathematical work, Parfaits, amiables et extensions (1918) (Perfect and Amicable Numbers and Their Extensions) and La chasse aux nombres (1929) (The Hunt for Numbers). He wrote the latter in the French village of Lambres-lez-Aire in the Pas-de-Calais, a short distance across the border with Belgium. Both were published by éditions Stevens of Brussels.

== Sociable chains ==
In a sociable chain, or aliquot cycle, a sequence of divisor-sums returns to the initial number. These are the two chains Poulet described in 1918:

12496 → 14288 → 15472 → 14536 → 14264 → 12496 (5 links)

14316 → 19116 → 31704 → 47616 → 83328 → 177792 → 295488 → 629072 → 589786 → 294896 → 358336 → 418904 → 366556 → 274924 → 275444 → 243760 → 376736 → 381028 → 285778 → 152990 → 122410 → 97946 → 48976 → 45946 → 22976 → 22744 → 19916 → 17716 → 14316 (28 links)

The second chain remains by far the longest known, despite the exhaustive computer searches begun by the French mathematician Henri Cohen in 1969. Poulet introduced sociable chains in a paper in the journal L'Intermédiaire des Mathématiciens #25 (1918). The paper ran like this:

If one considers a whole number a, the sum b of its proper divisors, the sum c of the proper divisors of b, the sum d of the proper divisors of c, and so on, one creates a sequence that, continued indefinitely, can develop in three ways:

The most frequent is to arrive at a prime number, then at unity [i.e., 1]. The sequence ends here.

One arrives at a previously calculated number. The sequence is indefinite and periodic. If the period is one, the number is perfect. If the period is two, the numbers are amicable. But the period can be longer than two, involving what I will call, to keep the same terminology, sociable numbers. For example, the number 12496 creates a period of four terms, the number 14316 a period of 28 terms.

Finally, in some cases a sequence creates very large numbers that become impossible to resolve into divisors. For example, the number 138.

This being so, I ask:

If this third case really exists or if, calculating long enough, one would not necessarily end in one of the two other cases, as I am driven to believe.

If sociable chains other than those above can be found, especially chains of three terms. (It will be pointless, I think, to try numbers below 12000, because I have tested all of them.)

The French original runs like this:

Si l'on considère un nombre entier a, la somme b de ses parties aliquotes, la somme c des parties aliquotes de b, la somme d des parties aliquotes de c et ainsi de suite, on obtient un développement qui, poussé indéfiniment, peut se présenter sous trois aspects différents:

Le plus souvent on finit par tomber sur un nombre premier, puis sur l'unité. Le développement est fini.

On retrouve à un moment donné un nombre déjà recontré. Le développement est indéfini et périodique. Si la période n'a qu'un terme, ce terme est un nombre parfait. Si la période a deux termes, ces termes sont des nombres amiables. La période peut avoir plus de deux termes, qu'on pourrait appeler, pour garder la méme terminologie, des nombres sociables.

Par exemple le nombre 12496 engendre une période de 4 termes, le nombre 14316 une période de 28 termes.

Enfin dans certains cas, on arrive à des nombres très grands qui rendent la calcul insupportable. Exemple: le nombre 138.

Cela étant, je demande:

Si ce troisième cas existe réellement ou si, en poursuivant indéfiniment le calcul, il ne se résoudrait pas nécessairement dans l'un ou l'autre des deux premiers, comme je suis porté à le croire.

Si l'on connait d'autres groupes sociables que ceux donnés plus haut, notament des groupes de trois termes. (Il est inutile, je pense, d'essayer les nombres inférieurs à 12000 que j'ai tous examinés.)
