= Harmonic number (disambiguation) =

In number theory, the harmonic numbers are the sums of the inverses of integers, forming the harmonic series. Harmonic number may also refer to:

- Harmonic, a periodic wave with a frequency that is an integral multiple of the frequency of another wave
- Harmonic divisor numbers, also called Ore numbers or Ore's harmonic numbers, positive integers whose divisors have an integral harmonic mean
- 3-smooth numbers, numbers whose only prime factors are 2 and 3
