= Pyramid puzzle =

Pyramid puzzle may refer to:

== Mathematics ==
- Cannonball problem, a mathematical problem
- Tower of Hanoi, a mathematical game

== Other ==
- Pyramid puzzle, a type of mechanical puzzle
