= Muhammad Baqir Yazdi =

Iranian mathematician

- محمد باقر یزدی
- Born: 16th century Persia (modern-day Iran)
- Died: 16th century
- Known for: Discovery of the amicable number pair 9,363,584 and 9,437,056
- Notable work: Oyoun Alhesab
- Scientific career
- Fields: Mathematics

Muhammad Baqir Yazdi Persian: محمدباقر یزدی was an Iranian mathematician who lived in the 16th century. He gave the pair of amicable numbers 9,363,584 and 9,437,056 many years before Euler's contribution to amicable numbers. His major book is Oyoun Alhesab (Arabic:عيون الحساب).

== Works ==
- Oyoun al-Hisab: Yazdi's principal mathematical text is Oyoun al-Hisab (Arabic: عيون الحساب), known as The Sources of Arithmetic. It represents a late Islamic scholarly attempt to systematize arithmetic, geometry, and algebra inherited from earlier traditions.

=== Contributions to number theory ===
Yazdi identified the Amicable numbers (9,363,584; 9,437,056), which he derived using the classic formula of Thābit ibn Qurra for 𝑛 = 7. Though often attributed to Descartes or Fermat, this pair was first recorded by Yazdi.
