= 9999 (number) =

← 9998	9999	10000 →
- List of numbers; Integers; ← 0 1k 2k 3k 4k 5k 6k 7k 8k 9k →
- Cardinal: nine thousand nine hundred ninety-nine
- Ordinal: 9999th (nine thousand nine hundred ninety-ninth)
- Factorization: 8120239540371
- Divisors: 1236
- Greek numeral: ,ΘϠϞΘ´
- Roman numeral: MX̅CMXCIX, or I̅X̅CMXCIX
- Binary: 10011100001111_{2}
- Ternary: 111201100_{3}
- Senary: 114143_{6}
- Octal: 23417_{8}
- Duodecimal: 5953_{12}
- Hexadecimal: 270F_{16}

9999 (nine thousand nine hundred [and] ninety-nine) is the natural number following 9998 and preceding 10000.

== Mathematics ==
9999 is the largest 4-digit whole number.

9999 can be used as a divisor to generate 4-digit decimal recurrences. For example, 1234 / 9999 = 0.123412341234... .

9999 is a Kaprekar number.

== Computer and software ==
9999 was the last possible line number in some older programming languages such as BASIC. Often the line "9999 END" was the first line written for a new program.

Some very old software used "9999" as end of file, however no problems occurred on September 9, 1999.

== Videogames ==
The King of Fighters character K9999 has the number in his name, although it is read as "kay-four-nine".

In Final Fantasy and other RPGs, 9999 is often the maximum damage or healing number the game is allowed to calculate.

== Other uses ==
9999 is an auspicious number in Chinese folklore. Many estimations of the rooms contained in the Forbidden City point to 9999. Chinese tomb contracts often involved being buried with 9999 coins, a practice related to Joss paper, as it was believed the dead would need that amount to buy the burial plot from the Earth goddess.

9999 is also the emergency telephone number in Oman.
