= Cannonball problem =

Mathematical problem of square numbers which are also square-pyramidal

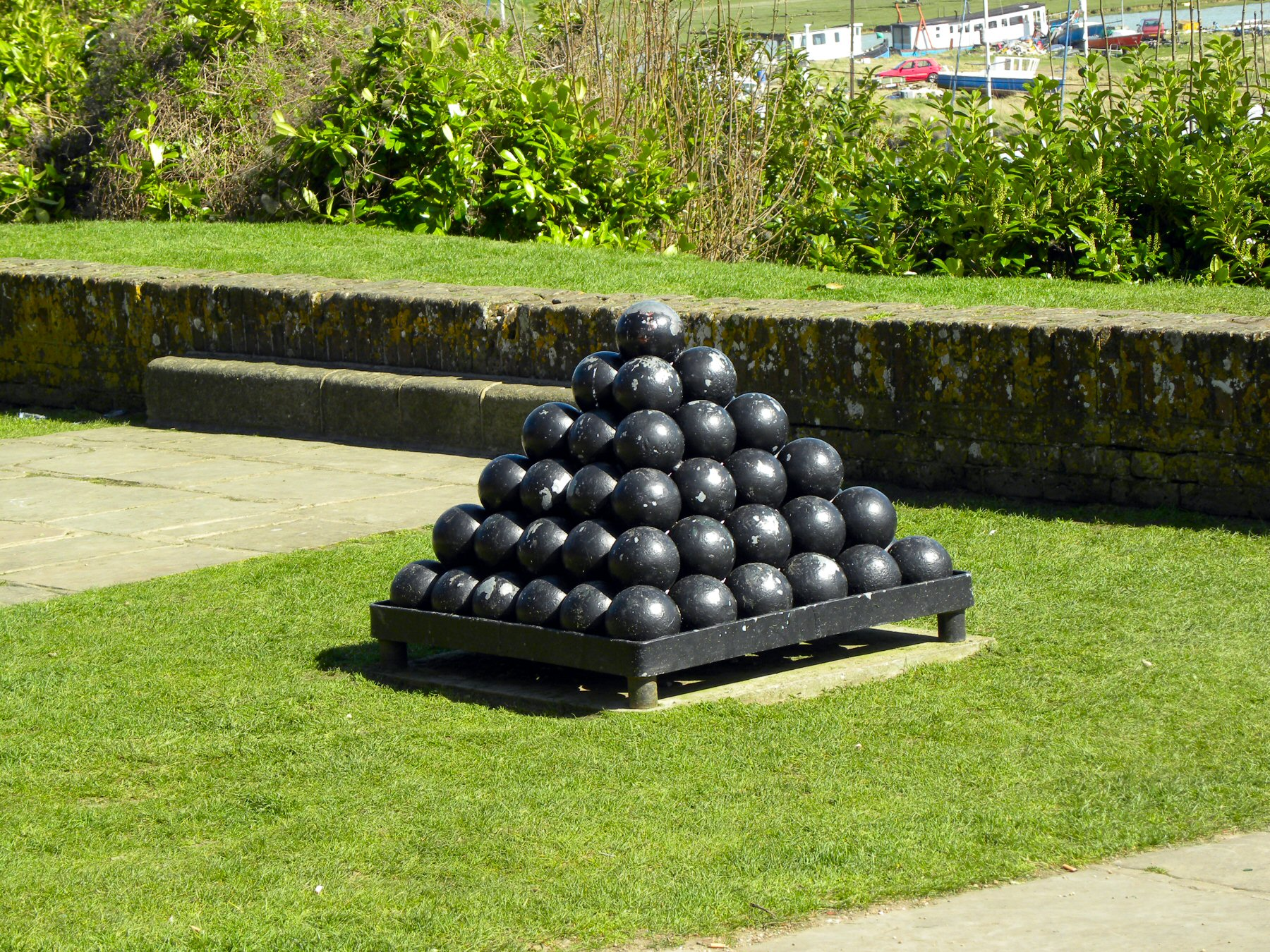
A square pyramid of cannonballs in a square frame

In the mathematics of figurate numbers, the cannonball problem asks which numbers are both square and square pyramidal. The problem can be stated as: given a square arrangement of cannonballs, for what size squares can these cannonballs also be arranged into a square pyramid? Equivalently, which squares can be represented as the sum of consecutive squares, starting from 1? The only solutions are the numbers 0, 1, and 4900.

== Formulation as a Diophantine equation ==
When cannonballs are stacked within a square frame, the number of balls is a square pyramidal number. Thomas Harriot gave a formula for these numbers around 1587, answering a question posed to him by Sir Walter Raleigh on their expedition to America. Édouard Lucas formulated the cannonball problem as a Diophantine equation
$$\sum_{n=1}^{N} n^2 = M^2$$
or
$$\frac{1}{6} N(N+1)(2N+1) = \frac{2N^3+3N^2+N}{6} = M^2.$$

== Solution ==
4900 cannonballs can be arranged as either a square of side 70 or a square pyramid of side 24

Lucas conjectured that the only solutions are (N,M) = (0,0), (1,1), and (24,70), using either 0, 1, or 4900 cannonballs. It was not until 1918 that G. N. Watson found a proof for this fact, using elliptic functions. More recently, elementary proofs have been published.

== Applications ==
The solution N = 24, M = 70 can be used for constructing the Leech lattice. The result has relevance to the bosonic string theory in 26 dimensions.

Although it is possible to tile a geometric square with unequal squares, it is not possible to do so with a solution to the cannonball problem. The squares with side lengths from 1 to 24 have areas equal to the square with side length 70, but they cannot be arranged to tile it.

== Related problems ==
A triangular-pyramid version of the cannonball problem, which is to yield a perfect square from the N^{th} tetrahedral number, would have N = 48. That means that the (24 × 2 = ) 48th tetrahedral number equals to (70^{2} × 2^{2} = 140^{2} = ) 19600. This is comparable with the 24th square pyramid having a total of 70^{2} cannonballs. This is because a square pyramidal number is one-fourth of a larger tetrahedral number (meaning the points from four copies of the same square pyramid can be rearranged to form a single tetrahedron with twice as many points along each edge).

Similarly, a pentagonal-pyramid version of the cannonball problem to produce a perfect square, would have N = 8, yielding a total of (14 × 14 = ) 196 cannonballs.

The only numbers that are simultaneously triangular and square pyramidal are 1, 55, 91, and 208335.

There are no numbers (other than the trivial solution 1) that are both tetrahedral and square pyramidal.

== See also ==
- Square triangular number, the numbers that are simultaneously square and triangular
- Close-packing of equal spheres
