= Amicable triple =

Mathematics

In mathematics, an amicable triple is a set of three different numbers so related that the restricted sum of the divisors of each is equal to the sum of the other two numbers.

In another equivalent characterization, an amicable triple is a set of three different numbers so related that the sum of the divisors of each is equal to the sum of the three numbers.

So a triple (a, b, c) of natural numbers is called amicable if s(a) = b + c, s(b) = a + c and s(c) = a + b, or equivalently if σ(a) = σ(b) = σ(c) = a + b + c. Here σ(n) is the sum of all positive divisors, and s(n) = σ(n) − n is the aliquot sum. The smallest amicable triple is (1980, 2016, 2556).
