= Sociable number =

Numbers whose aliquot sums form a cyclic sequence

In mathematics, sociable numbers are numbers whose aliquot sums form a periodic sequence. They are generalizations of the concepts of perfect numbers and amicable numbers. The first two sociable sequences, or sociable chains, were discovered and named by the Belgian mathematician Paul Poulet in 1918. In a sociable sequence, each number is the sum of the proper divisors of the preceding number, i.e., the sum excludes the preceding number itself. For the sequence to be sociable, the sequence must be cyclic and return to its starting point.

The period of the sequence, or order of the set of sociable numbers, is the number of numbers in this cycle.

If the period of the sequence is 1, the number is a sociable number of order 1, or a perfect number—for example, the proper divisors of 6 are 1, 2, and 3, whose sum is again 6. A pair of amicable numbers is a set of sociable numbers of order 2. There are no known sociable numbers of order 3, and searches for them have been made up to $5 \times 10^7$ as of 1970.

It is an open question whether all numbers end up at either a sociable number or at a prime (and hence 1), or, equivalently, whether there exist numbers whose aliquot sequence never terminates, and hence grows without bound.

== Example ==
As an example, the number 1,264,460 is a sociable number whose cyclic aliquot sequence has a period of 4:

The sum of the proper divisors of $1264460$ ($=2^2\cdot5\cdot17\cdot3719$) is

1 + 2 + 4 + 5 + 10 + 17 + 20 + 34 + 68 + 85 + 170 + 340 + 3719 + 7438 + 14876 + 18595 + 37190 + 63223 + 74380 + 126446 + 252892 + 316115 + 632230 = 1547860,

the sum of the proper divisors of $1547860$ ($=2^2\cdot5\cdot193\cdot401$) is

1 + 2 + 4 + 5 + 10 + 20 + 193 + 386 + 401 + 772 + 802 + 965 + 1604 + 1930 + 2005 + 3860 + 4010 + 8020 + 77393 + 154786 + 309572 + 386965 + 773930 = 1727636,

the sum of the proper divisors of $1727636$ ($=2^2\cdot521\cdot829$) is

1 + 2 + 4 + 521 + 829 + 1042 + 1658 + 2084 + 3316 + 431909 + 863818 = 1305184, and

the sum of the proper divisors of $1305184$ ($=2^5\cdot40787$) is

1 + 2 + 4 + 8 + 16 + 32 + 40787 + 81574 + 163148 + 326296 + 652592 = 1264460.

== List of known sociable numbers ==
The following categorizes all known sociable numbers as of October 2024 by the length of the corresponding aliquot sequence:

Sequence length	Number of known sequences	lowest number in sequence
1 (Perfect number)	52	6
2 (Amicable number)	1 billion+	220
4	5398	1,264,460
5	1	12,496
6	5	21,548,919,483
8	4	1,095,447,416
9	1	805,984,760
28	1	14,316

The 5-cycle sequence is: 12496, 14288, 15472, 14536, 14264

The only known 28-cycle is: 14316, 19116, 31704, 47616, 83328, 177792, 295488, 629072, 589786, 294896, 358336, 418904, 366556, 274924, 275444, 243760, 376736, 381028, 285778, 152990, 122410, 97946, 48976, 45946, 22976, 22744, 19916, 17716 (sequence A072890 in the OEIS).

These two sequences provide the only sociable numbers below 1 million (other than the perfect and amicable numbers).

== Searching for sociable numbers ==
The aliquot sequence can be represented as a directed graph, $G_{n,s}$, for a given integer $n$, where $s(k)$ denotes the sum of the proper divisors of $k$. Cycles in $G_{n,s}$ represent sociable numbers within the interval $[1,n]$. Two special cases are loops that represent perfect numbers and cycles of length two that represent amicable pairs.

== Conjecture of the sum of sociable number cycles ==
It is conjectured that as the number of sociable number cycles with length greater than 2 approaches infinity, the proportion of the sums of the sociable number cycles divisible by 10 approaches 1 (sequence A292217 in the OEIS).
