= Highly cototient number =

Numbers k where x - phi(x) = k has many solutions

In number theory, a branch of mathematics, a highly cototient number is a positive integer $k$ which is above 1 and has more solutions to the equation

$$x - \phi(x) = k$$

than any other integer below $k$ and above 1. Here, $\phi$ is Euler's totient function. There are infinitely many solutions to the equation for

$k$ = 1

so this value is excluded in the definition. The first few highly cototient numbers are:

2, 4, 8, 23, 35, 47, 59, 63, 83, 89, 113, 119, 167, 209, 269, 299, 329, 389, 419, 509, 629, 659, 779, 839, 1049, 1169, 1259, 1469, 1649, 1679, 1889, ... (sequence A100827 in the OEIS)

Many of the highly cototient numbers are odd.

The concept is somewhat analogous to that of highly composite numbers. Just as there are infinitely many highly composite numbers, there are also infinitely many highly cototient numbers. Computations become harder, since integer factorization becomes harder as the numbers get larger.

== Example ==
The cototient of $x$ is defined as $x - \phi(x)$, i.e. the number of positive integers less than or equal to $x$ that have at least one prime factor in common with $x$. For example, the cototient of 6 is 4 since these four positive integers have a prime factor in common with 6: 2, 3, 4, 6. The cototient of 8 is also 4, this time with these integers: 2, 4, 6, 8. There are exactly two numbers, 6 and 8, which have cototient 4. There are fewer numbers which have cototient 2 and cototient 3 (one number in each case), so 4 is a highly cototient number.

(sequence A063740 in the OEIS)

**k** (highly cototient k are bolded)	0	1	**2**	3	**4**	5	6	7	**8**	9	10	11	12	13	14	15	16	17	18	19	20	21	22	**23**	24	25	26	27	28	29	30
**Number of solutions to x − φ(x) = k**	1	∞	1	1	2	1	1	2	3	2	0	2	3	2	1	2	3	3	1	3	1	3	1	4	4	3	0	4	1	4	3

n	ks such that $k-\phi(k)=n$	number of ks such that $k-\phi(k)=n$ (sequence A063740 in the OEIS)
0	1	1
1	2, 3, 5, 7, 11, 13, 17, 19, 23, 29, 31, 37, 41, 43, 47, ... (all primes)	∞
**2**	4	1
3	9	1
**4**	6, 8	2
5	25	1
6	10	1
7	15, 49	2
**8**	12, 14, 16	3
9	21, 27	2
10		0
11	35, 121	2
12	18, 20, 22	3
13	33, 169	2
14	26	1
15	39, 55	2
16	24, 28, 32	3
17	65, 77, 289	3
18	34	1
19	51, 91, 361	3
20	38	1
21	45, 57, 85	3
22	30	1
**23**	95, 119, 143, 529	4
24	36, 40, 44, 46	4
25	69, 125, 133	3
26		0
27	63, 81, 115, 187	4
28	52	1
29	161, 209, 221, 841	4
30	42, 50, 58	3
31	87, 247, 961	3
32	48, 56, 62, 64	4
33	93, 145, 253	3
34		0
**35**	75, 155, 203, 299, 323	5
36	54, 68	2
37	217, 1369	2
38	74	1
39	99, 111, 319, 391	4
40	76	1
41	185, 341, 377, 437, 1681	5
42	82	1
43	123, 259, 403, 1849	4
44	60, 86	2
45	117, 129, 205, 493	4
46	66, 70	2
**47**	215, 287, 407, 527, 551, 2209	6
48	72, 80, 88, 92, 94	5
49	141, 301, 343, 481, 589	5
50		0

== Primes ==
The first few highly cototient numbers which are primes are

2, 23, 47, 59, 83, 89, 113, 167, 269, 389, 419, 509, 659, 839, 1049, 1259, 1889, 2099, 2309, 2729, 3359, 3989, 4289, 4409, 5879, 6089, 6719, 9029, 9239, ... (sequence A105440 in the OEIS)

== See also ==
- Highly totient number
