= 10,000 Promises. =

Japanese pop music group

10,000 Promises
- Origin: Japan
- Genre: J-Pop
- Years active: 2004 – 2007
- Label: SME Records
- Members: Taiki, Yohei, Shinya, Shaw

10,000 Promises. is a Japanese popular music group. Its members are Shaw, Shinya, Taiki, and Yohei. They made their debut with the single "One True Love" on February 18, 2004. It seems the name of this band derived from one of Backstreet Boys music tracks as "10,000 Promises".

In July 2001, Taiki who was known for his live performances met Yohei who was already making songs and they decided to work together. During September of that same year, Taiki's friend from his school days, Shinya, got together with Taiki and Yohei. With an introduction from another friend, the three met Shaw and formed the group 10,000 Promises.

They've done renditions of the popular Westlife hits, "What Makes a Man" and "Bop Bop Baby"

== Discography ==
=== Singles ===
- 'One True Love' (February 18, 2004)
- 'Sailing' (April 7, 2004)
- 'Fruit' (July 7, 2004)
- 'Ame ga Agari Boku no Kokoro wa' (November 26, 2004)
- 'Love, Again' (July 6, 2005)

=== Albums ===
- KI・SE・KI Vol.1 ~internal~ (October 19, 2005)
- KI・SE・KI Vol.2 ~external~ (October 19, 2005)
