= Sparsely totient number =

Number n where phi(m) is greater than phi(n) for all m greater than n

In mathematics, specifically number theory, a sparsely totient number is a natural number, n, such that for all m > n,

$$\varphi(m)>\varphi(n)$$

where $\varphi$ is Euler's totient function. The first few sparsely totient numbers are:

2, 6, 12, 18, 30, 42, 60, 66, 90, 120, 126, 150, 210, 240, 270, 330, 420, 462, 510, 630, 660, 690, 840, 870, 1050, 1260, 1320, 1470, 1680, 1890, 2310, 2730, 2940, 3150, 3570, 3990, 4620, 4830, 5460, 5610, 5670, 6090, 6930, 7140, 7350, 8190, 9240, 9660, 9870, ... (sequence A036913 in the OEIS).

The concept was introduced by David Masser and Peter Man-Kit Shiu in 1986. As they showed, every primorial is sparsely totient.

== Properties ==
- If P(n) is the largest prime factor of n, then $\liminf P(n)/\log n=1$.
- $P(n)\ll \log^\delta n$ holds for an exponent $\delta=37/20$.
- It is conjectured that $\limsup P(n) / \log n = 2$.
- They are always even because if x is odd, then 2x also has the same Totient function, trivially failing the condition that all numbers more than it has more value of Totient function than it.
