= Automorphic number =

Number whose square ends in the same digits

In mathematics, an automorphic number (sometimes referred to as a circular number) is a natural number in a given number base $b$ whose square "ends" in the same digits as the number itself.

== Definition and properties ==
Given a number base $b$, a natural number $n$ with $k$ digits is an automorphic number if $n$ is a fixed point of the polynomial function $f(x) = x^2$ over $\mathbb{Z}/b^k\mathbb{Z}$, the ring of integers modulo $b^k$. As the inverse limit of $\mathbb{Z}/b^k\mathbb{Z}$ is $\mathbb{Z}_b$, the ring of $b$-adic integers, automorphic numbers are used to find the numerical representations of the fixed points of $f(x) = x^2$ over $\mathbb{Z}_b$.

For example, with $b = 10$, there are four 10-adic fixed points of $f(x) = x^2$, the last 10 digits of which are:

$$\ldots 0000000000$$
$$\ldots 0000000001$$
$\ldots 8212890625$ (sequence A018247 in the OEIS)
$\ldots 1787109376$ (sequence A018248 in the OEIS)

Thus, the automorphic numbers in base 10 are 0, 1, 5, 6, 25, 76, 376, 625, 9376, 90625, 109376, 890625, 2890625, 7109376, 12890625, 87109376, 212890625, 787109376, 1787109376, 8212890625, 18212890625, 81787109376, 918212890625, 9918212890625, 40081787109376, 59918212890625, ... (sequence A003226 in the OEIS).

A fixed point of $f(x)$ is a zero of the function $g(x) = f(x) - x$. In the ring of integers modulo $b$, there are $2^{\omega(b)}$ zeroes to $g(x) = x^2 - x$, where the prime omega function $\omega(b)$ is the number of distinct prime factors in $b$. An element $x$ in $\mathbb{Z}/b\mathbb{Z}$ is a zero of $g(x) = x^2 - x$ if and only if $x \equiv 0 \bmod p^{v_p(b)}$ or $x \equiv 1 \bmod p^{v_p(b)}$ for all $p|b$. Since there are two possible values in $\lbrace 0, 1 \rbrace$, and there are $\omega(b)$ such $p|b$, there are $2^{\omega(b)}$ zeroes of $g(x) = x^2 - x$, and thus there are $2^{\omega(b)}$ fixed points of $f(x) = x^2$. According to Hensel's lemma, if there are $k$ zeroes or fixed points of a polynomial function modulo $b$, then there are $k$ corresponding zeroes or fixed points of the same function modulo any power of $b$, and this remains true in the inverse limit. Thus, in any given base $b$ there are $2^{\omega(b)}$ $b$-adic fixed points of $f(x) = x^2$.

As 0 is always a zero-divisor, 0 and 1 are always fixed points of $f(x) = x^2$, and 0 and 1 are automorphic numbers in every base. These solutions are called trivial automorphic numbers. If $b$ is a prime power, then the ring of $b$-adic numbers has no zero-divisors other than 0, so the only fixed points of $f(x) = x^2$ are 0 and 1. As a result, nontrivial automorphic numbers, those other than 0 and 1, only exist when the base $b$ has at least two distinct prime factors.

=== Automorphic numbers in base b ===
All $b$-adic numbers are represented in base $b$, using A−Z to represent digit values 10 to 35.

$b$	Prime factors of $b$	Fixed points in $\mathbb{Z}/b\mathbb{Z}$ of $f(x) = x^2$	$b$-adic fixed points of $f(x) = x^2$	Automorphic numbers in base $b$
6	2, 3	0, 1, 3, 4	$\ldots 0000000000$ $\ldots 0000000001$ $\ldots 2221350213$ $\ldots 3334205344$	0, 1, 3, 4, 13, 44, 213, 344, 5344, 50213, 205344, 350213, 1350213, 4205344, 21350213, 34205344, 221350213, 334205344, 2221350213, 3334205344, ...
10	2, 5	0, 1, 5, 6	$\ldots 0000000000$ $\ldots 0000000001$ $\ldots 8212890625$ $\ldots 1787109376$	0, 1, 5, 6, 25, 76, 376, 625, 9376, 90625, 109376, 890625, 2890625, 7109376, 12890625, 87109376, 212890625, 787109376, 1787109376, 8212890625, ...
12	2, 3	0, 1, 4, 9	$\ldots 0000000000$ $\ldots 0000000001$ $\ldots 21\text{B}61\text{B}3854$ $\ldots 9\text{A}05\text{A}08369$	0, 1, 4, 9, 54, 69, 369, 854, 3854, 8369, B3854, 1B3854, A08369, 5A08369, 61B3854, B61B3854, 1B61B3854, A05A08369, 21B61B3854, 9A05A08369, ...
14	2, 7	0, 1, 7, 8	$\ldots 0000000000$ $\ldots 0000000001$ $\ldots 7337\text{A}\text{A}0\text{C}37$ $\ldots 6\text{A}\text{A}633\text{D}1\text{A}8$	0, 1, 7, 8, 37, A8, 1A8, C37, D1A8, 3D1A8, A0C37, 33D1A8, AA0C37, 633D1A8, 7AA0C37, 37AA0C37, A633D1A8, 337AA0C37, AA633D1A8, 6AA633D1A8, 7337AA0C37, ...
15	3, 5	0, 1, 6, 10	$\ldots 0000000000$ $\ldots 0000000001$ $\ldots 624\text{D}4\text{B}\text{D}\text{A}86$ $\ldots 8\text{C}\text{A}1\text{A}3146\text{A}$	0, 1, 6, A, 6A, 86, 46A, A86, 146A, DA86, 3146A, BDA86, 4BDA86, A3146A, 1A3146A, D4BDA86, 4D4BDA86, A1A3146A, 24D4BDA86, CA1A3146A, 624D4BDA86, 8CA1A3146A, ...
18	2, 3	0, 1, 9, 10	...000000...000001...4E1249...D3GFDA	
20	2, 5	0, 1, 5, 16	...000000...000001...1AB6B5...I98D8G	
21	3, 7	0, 1, 7, 15	...000000...000001...86H7G7...CE3D4F	
22	2, 11	0, 1, 11, 12	...000000...000001...8D185B...D8KDGC	
24	2, 3	0, 1, 9, 16	...000000...000001...E4D0L9...9JAN2G	
26	2, 13	0, 1, 13, 14	...0000...0001...1G6D...O9JE	
28	2, 7	0, 1, 8, 21	...0000...0001...AAQ8...HH1L	
30	2, 3, 5	0, 1, 6, 10, 15, 16, 21, 25	...0000...0001...B2J6...H13A...1Q7F...S3MG...CSQL...IRAP	
33	3, 11	0, 1, 12, 22	...0000...0001...1KPM...VC7C	
34	2, 17	0, 1, 17, 18	...0000...0001...248H...VTPI	
35	5, 7	0, 1, 15, 21	...0000...0001...5MXL...TC1F	
36	2, 3	0, 1, 9, 28	...0000...0001...DN29...MCXS	

== Extensions ==
Automorphic numbers can be extended to any such polynomial function of degree $n$ $f(x) = \sum_{i = 0}^{n} a_i x^i$ with b-adic coefficients $a_i$. These generalised automorphic numbers form a tree.

=== a-automorphic numbers ===
An $a$-automorphic number occurs when the polynomial function is $f(x) = ax^2$

For example, with $b = 10$ and $a = 2$, as there are two fixed points for $f(x) = 2x^2$ in $\mathbb{Z}/10\mathbb{Z}$ ($x = 0$ and $x = 8$), according to Hensel's lemma there are two 10-adic fixed points for $f(x) = 2x^2$,

$$\ldots 0000000000$$
$$\ldots 0893554688$$

so the 2-automorphic numbers in base 10 are 0, 8, 88, 688, 4688...

=== Trimorphic numbers ===
A trimorphic number or spherical number occurs when the polynomial function is $f(x) = x^3$. All automorphic numbers are trimorphic. The terms circular and spherical were formerly used for the slightly different case of a number whose powers all have the same last digit as the number itself.

For base $b = 10$, the trimorphic numbers are:

0, 1, 4, 5, 6, 9, 24, 25, 49, 51, 75, 76, 99, 125, 249, 251, 375, 376, 499, 501, 624, 625, 749, 751, 875, 999, 1249, 3751, 4375, 4999, 5001, 5625, 6249, 8751, 9375, 9376, 9999, ... (sequence A033819 in the OEIS)

For base $b = 12$, the trimorphic numbers are:

0, 1, 3, 4, 5, 7, 8, 9, B, 15, 47, 53, 54, 5B, 61, 68, 69, 75, A7, B3, BB, 115, 253, 368, 369, 4A7, 5BB, 601, 715, 853, 854, 969, AA7, BBB, 14A7, 2369, 3853, 3854, 4715, 5BBB, 6001, 74A7, 8368, 8369, 9853, A715, BBBB, ...

== Programming example ==
def hensels_lemma(polynomial_function, base: int, power: int) -> list[int]:
    """Hensel's lemma."""
    if power == 0:
        return [0]
    if power > 0:
        roots = hensels_lemma(polynomial_function, base, power - 1)
    new_roots = []
    for root in roots:
        for i in range(0, base):
            new_i = i * base ** (power - 1) + root
            new_root = polynomial_function(new_i) % pow(base, power)
            if new_root == 0:
                new_roots.append(new_i)
    return new_roots

base = 10
digits = 10

def automorphic_polynomial(x: int) -> int:
    return x ** 2 - x

for i in range(1, digits + 1):
    print(hensels_lemma(automorphic_polynomial, base, i))

== See also ==
- Arithmetic dynamics
- Kaprekar number
- p-adic number
- p-adic analysis
- Zero-divisor
