= Meander (mathematics) =

In mathematics, a meander or closed meander is a self-avoiding closed curve which crosses a given line a number of times, meaning that it intersects the line while passing from one side to the other. Intuitively, a meander can be viewed as a meandering river with a straight road crossing the river over a number of bridges. The points where the line and the curve cross are therefore referred to as "bridges".

== Meander ==
Given a fixed line L in the Euclidean plane, a meander of order n is a self-avoiding closed curve in the plane that crosses the line at 2n points. Two meanders are equivalent if one meander can be continuously deformed into the other while maintaining its property of being a meander and leaving the order of the bridges on the road, in the order in which they are crossed, invariant.

=== Examples ===
The single meander of order 1 intersects the line twice:

This meander intersects the line four times and thus has order 2:

There are two meanders of order 2. Flipping the image vertically produces the other.

There are eight non-equivalent meanders of order 3, each intersecting the line six times. Here are two of them:

=== Meandric numbers ===
The number of distinct meanders of order n is the meandric number M_{n}. The first fifteen meandric numbers are given below (sequence A005315 in the OEIS).

M_{1} = 1
M_{2} = 2
M_{3} = 8
M_{4} = 42
M_{5} = 262
M_{6} = 1828
M_{7} = 13820
M_{8} = 110954
M_{9} = 933458
M_{10} = 8152860
M_{11} = 73424650
M_{12} = 678390116
M_{13} = 6405031050
M_{14} = 61606881612
M_{15} = 602188541928

=== Meandric permutations ===
Meandric permutation (1 8 5 4 3 6 7 2)

A meandric permutation of order n is defined on the set {1, 2, ..., 2n} and is determined as follows:

- With the line oriented from left to right, each intersection of the meander is consecutively labelled with the integers, starting at 1.
- The curve is oriented upward at the intersection labelled 1.
- The cyclic permutation with no fixed points is obtained by following the oriented curve through the labelled intersection points.

In the diagram on the right, the order 4 meandric permutation is given by (1 8 5 4 3 6 7 2). This is a permutation written in cyclic notation and not to be confused with one-line notation.

If π is a meandric permutation, then π^{2} consists of two cycles, one containing all the even symbols and the other all the odd symbols. Permutations with this property are called alternate permutations, since the symbols in the original permutation alternate between odd and even integers. However, not all alternate permutations are meandric because it may not be possible to draw them without introducing a self-intersection in the curve. For example, the order 3 alternate permutation, (1 4 3 6 5 2), is not meandric.

== Open meander ==
Given a fixed line L in the Euclidean plane, an open meander of order n is a non-self-intersecting curve in the plane that crosses the line at n points. Two open meanders are equivalent if one can be continuously deformed into the other while maintaining its property of being an open meander and leaving the order of the bridges on the road, in the order in which they are crossed, invariant.

=== Examples ===
The open meander of order 1 intersects the line once:

The open meander of order 2 intersects the line twice:

=== Open meandric numbers ===
The number of distinct open meanders of order n is the open meandric number m_{n}. The first fifteen open meandric numbers are given below (sequence A005316 in the OEIS).

m_{1} = 1
m_{2} = 1
m_{3} = 2
m_{4} = 3
m_{5} = 8
m_{6} = 14
m_{7} = 42
m_{8} = 81
m_{9} = 262
m_{10} = 538
m_{11} = 1828
m_{12} = 3926
m_{13} = 13820
m_{14} = 30694
m_{15} = 110954

== Semi-meander ==
Given a fixed oriented ray R (a closed half line) in the Euclidean plane, a semi-meander of order n is a non-self-intersecting closed curve in the plane that crosses the ray at n points. Two semi-meanders are equivalent if one can be continuously deformed into the other while maintaining its property of being a semi-meander and leaving the order of the bridges on the ray, in the order in which they are crossed, invariant.

=== Examples ===
The semi-meander of order 1 intersects the ray once:

The semi-meander of order 2 intersects the ray twice:

=== Semi-meandric numbers ===
The number of distinct semi-meanders of order n is the semi-meandric number M_{n} (usually denoted with an overline instead of an underline). The first fifteen semi-meandric numbers are given below (sequence A000682 in the OEIS).

M_{1} = 1
M_{2} = 1
M_{3} = 2
M_{4} = 4
M_{5} = 10
M_{6} = 24
M_{7} = 66
M_{8} = 174
M_{9} = 504
M_{10} = 1406
M_{11} = 4210
M_{12} = 12198
M_{13} = 37378
M_{14} = 111278
M_{15} = 346846

== Properties of meandric numbers ==
There is an injective function from meandric to open meandric numbers:

M_{n} = m_{2n−1}

Each meandric number can be bounded by semi-meandric numbers:

M_{n} ≤ M_{n} ≤ M_{2n}

For n > 1, meandric numbers are even:

M_{n} ≡ 0 (mod 2)
