= Zeisel number =

Type of number

A Zeisel number is a square-free integer N = p_{1} p_{2} ... p_{n} such as the p_{i}s are distinct prime numbers and n ≥ 3 such that p_{i} = A p_{i-1} + B for i = 1, 2, ..., n, p_{0} taken as 1, and with A and B some fixed integers. They are named after Helmut Zeisel, an Austrian mathematician.

The first few Zeisel numbers are:

105, 1419, 1729, 1885, 4505, 5719, 15387, 24211, 25085, 27559, 31929, 54205, 59081, 114985, 207177, 208681, 233569, ... (sequence A051015 in the OEIS)

These correspond to the mathematical constants: (1, 2), (4, −1), (1, 6) (2, 3), (3, 2), ...

== History ==
Zeisel numbers were studied by Kevin Brown, who searched for prime solutions to 2^{n - 1} + n. Helmut Zeisel discovered that 1885 = n is prime for 2^{n - 1} + n. Brown discovered that its prime factors fit the recurrrence relation with A = 2 and B = 3. He named numbers fitting the recurrence relation "Zeisel numbers" which is now commonly used. Zeisel himself suggested the term "Brown-Zeisel number" because of their study of the number, but this has not caught on.
