= 60,000 =

← 59999	60000	60001 →
- List of numbers; Integers; ← 0 10k 20k 30k 40k 50k 60k 70k 80k 90k →
- Cardinal: sixty thousand
- Ordinal: 60000th (sixty thousandth)
- Factorization: 2^{5} × 3 × 5^{4}
- Greek numeral: $\stackrel{\digamma}{\Mu}$
- Roman numeral: L̅X̅, l̅x̅
- Binary: 1110101001100000_{2}
- Ternary: 10001022020_{3}
- Senary: 1141440_{6}
- Octal: 165140_{8}
- Duodecimal: 2A880_{12}
- Hexadecimal: EA60_{16}

60,000 (sixty thousand) is the natural number and integer that follows 59,999 and precedes 60,001. It contains 5 digits, starting with a six and followed by four zeroes.

== In mathematics ==
60,000 is a round number. It is also a Saint-Exupéry number; it is the product of the three sides of Pythagorean triangles.

It is the value of $\varphi$(75025).

== Selected numbers in the range 60,000–69,999 ==
=== 60,001 to 60,999 ===
- 60,049 = Leyland number using 3 & 10 (3^{10} + 10^{3})
- 60,101 = smallest prime with period of reciprocal 100

=== 61,000 to 61,999 ===
- 61,776 = 2^{4} x 3^{3} x 11 x 13 = 1^{5} + 2^{5} + 3^{5} + 4^{5} + 5^{5} + 6^{5} + 7^{5} + 8^{5}. It is an untouchable number, a triangular number, hexagonal number, 100-gonal number, and is polygonal in 6 other ways.
- 61,871 = approximate number of planck lengths to amount to one quectometer, the smallest SI unit of length.

=== 62,000 to 62,999 ===
- 62,208 = 3-smooth number
- 62,210 = Markov number
- 62,745 = Carmichael number

=== 63,000 to 63,999 ===
- 63,020 = amicable number with 76084
- 63,261 = number of partitions of 43
- 63,360 = inches in a mile
- 63,600 = number of free 12-ominoes
- 63,750 = pentagonal pyramidal number
- 63,973 = Carmichael number

=== 64,000 to 64,999 ===
- 64,000 = 40^{3}
- 64,009 = sum of the cubes of the first 22 positive integers
- 64,079 = Lucas number
- 64,442 = Number of integer degree intersections on Earth: 360 longitudes * 179 latitudes + 2 poles = 64442.
- 64,553 = smallest prime p such that pi(p) = floor(p/10), where pi is the prime counting function
- 64,620 : It is an untouchable number, a triangular number, hexagonal number, and a number such that pi(64620) = 64620/10.
- 64,661 = largest prime p such that pi(p) = floor(p/10), where pi is the prime counting function

=== 65,000 to 65,999 ===
- 65,025 = 255^{2}, palindromic in base 11 (44944_{11})
- 65,504 = largest representable value in half-precision floating-point format
- 65,534 = The Linux kernel defaults to 2^{16}−2 = 65,534 if a 32-bit group identifier doesn't fit into the return value of a 16-bit system call.
- 65,535 = largest value for an unsigned 16-bit integer on a computer.
- 65,536 = 2^{16} = 4^{8} = 16^{4} = 256^{2} also 2↑↑4=2↑↑↑3 using Knuth's up-arrow notation, smallest integer with exactly 17 divisors, palindromic in base 15 (14641_{15}), number of directed graphs on 4 labeled nodes
- 65,537 = largest known Fermat prime
- 65,539 = the 6544th prime number, and both 6544 and 65539 have digital root of 1; a regular prime; a larger member of a twin prime pair; a smaller member of a cousin prime pair; a happy prime; a weak prime; a middle member of a prime triplet, (65537, 65539, 65543); a middle member of a three-term primes in arithmetic progression, (65521, 65539, 65557).
- 65,792 = Leyland number using 2 & 16 (2^{16} + 16^{2})

=== 66,000 to 66,999 ===
- 66,012 = tribonacci number
- 66,049 = 257^{2}, palindromic in hexadecimal (10201_{16})
- 66,198 = Giuga number
- 66,666 = repdigit

=== 67,000 to 67,999 ===
- 67,081 = 259^{2}, palindromic in base 6 (1234321_{6})
- 67,171 = 1^{6} + 2^{6} + 3^{6} + 4^{6} + 5^{6} + 6^{6}
- 67,607 = largest of five remaining Seventeen or Bust numbers in the Sierpiński problem
- 67,626 = pentagonal pyramidal number

=== 68,000 to 68,999 ===
- 68,906 = number of prime numbers having six digits.

=== 69,000 to 69,999 ===
- 69,632 = Leyland number using 4 & 8 (4^{8} + 8^{4})
- 69,696 = square of 264; only known palindromic square that can be expressed as the sum of a pair of twin primes: 69,696 = 34847 + 34849.
- 69,984 = 3-smooth number

=== Primes ===
There are 878 prime numbers between 60000 and 70000.
