= 20,000 =

← 19999	20000	20001 →
- List of numbers; Integers; ← 0 10k 20k 30k 40k 50k 60k 70k 80k 90k →
- Cardinal: twenty thousand
- Ordinal: 20000th (twenty thousandth)
- Factorization: 2^{5} × 5^{4}
- Greek numeral: $\stackrel{\beta}{\Mu}$
- Roman numeral: X̅X̅, x̅x̅
- Binary: 100111000100000_{2}
- Ternary: 1000102202_{3}
- Senary: 232332_{6}
- Octal: 47040_{8}
- Duodecimal: B6A8_{12}
- Hexadecimal: 4E20_{16}
- Armenian: Ֆ

20,000 (twenty thousand) is the natural number that comes after 19,999 and before 20,001.

== Selected numbers in the range 20001–29999 ==
=== 20001 to 20999 ===
- 20002 = number of surface-points of a tetrahedron with edge-length 100
- 20067 = former smallest uninteresting number
- 20100 = sum of the first 200 natural numbers (hence the 200th triangular number)
- 20160 = 23rd highly composite number; smallest order belonging to two non-isomorphic simple groups: the alternating group A_{8} and the Chevalley group A_{2}(4)
- 20161 = largest integer that cannot be expressed as a sum of two abundant numbers
- 20230 = pentagonal pyramidal number
- 20412 = Leyland number: 9^{3} + 3^{9}
- 20540 = square pyramidal number
- 20569 = tetranacci number
- 20593 = unique prime in base 12
- 20736 = 144^{2} = 12^{4}, 10000_{12}, palindromic in base 15 (6226_{15}), also called a dozen great-gross in some duodecimal nomenclature.
- 20793 = little Schroeder number
- 20871 = number of weeks in exactly 400 years in the Gregorian calendar
- 20903 = first prime of form 120k + 23 that is not a full reptend prime
- 20990 = current smallest uninteresting number

=== 21000 to 21999 ===
- 21025 = 145^{2}, palindromic in base 12 (10201_{12})
- 21147 = Bell number
- 21181 = the least of five remaining Seventeen or Bust numbers in the Sierpiński problem
- 21209 = number of reduced trees with 23 nodes
- 21637 = number of partitions of 37
- 21856 = octahedral number
- 21943 = Friedman prime

=== 22000 to 22999 ===
- 22050 = pentagonal pyramidal number
- 22140 = square pyramidal number
- 22222 = repdigit, Kaprekar number: 22222^{2} = 493817284, 4938 + 17284 = 22222
- 22447 = cuban prime
- 22527 = Woodall number: 11 × 2^{11} − 1
- 22621 = repunit prime in base 12
- 22699 = one of five remaining Seventeen or Bust numbers in the Sierpiński problem

=== 23000 to 23999 ===
- 23000 = number of primes $\leq 2^{18}$.
- 23401 = Leyland number: 6^{5} + 5^{6}
- 23409 = 153^{2}, sum of the cubes of the first 17 positive integers
- 23497 = cuban prime
- 23821 = square pyramidal number
- 23833 = Padovan prime
- 23969 = octahedral number
- 23976 = pentagonal pyramidal number
- 23982 = year in which the Gregorian calendar will begin to differ from the tropical year by one week.

=== 24000 to 24999 ===
- 24000 = number of primitive polynomials of degree 20 over GF(2)
- 24211 = Zeisel number
- 24336 = 156^{2}, palindromic in base 5: 1234321_{5}
- 24389 = 29^{3}
- 24571 = cuban prime
- 24631 = Wedderburn–Etherington prime
- 24649 = 157^{2}, palindromic in base 12: 12321_{12}
- 24737 = one of five remaining Seventeen or Bust numbers in the Sierpinski problem
- 24742 = number of signed trees with 10 nodes

=== 25000 to 25999 ===
- 25011 = the smallest composite number, ending in 1, 3, 7, or 9, that in base 10 remains composite after any insertion of a digit
- 25085 = Zeisel number
- 25117 = cuban prime
- 25200 = 224th triangular number, 24th highly composite number, smallest number with exactly 90 factors
- 25205 = largest number whose factorial is less than 10^{100000}
- 25482 = number of 21-bead necklaces (turning over is allowed) where complements are equivalent
- 25585 = square pyramidal number
- 25724 = Fine number
- 25920 = smallest number with exactly 70 factors

=== 26000 to 26999 ===
- 26015 = number of partitions of 38
- 26214 = octahedral number
- 26227 = cuban prime
- 26272 = number of 20-bead binary necklaces with beads of 2 colors where the colors may be swapped but turning over is not allowed
- 26861 = smallest number for which there are more primes of the form 4k + 1 than of the form 4k + 3 up to the number, against Chebyshev's bias
- 26896 = 164^{2}, palindromic in base 9: 40804_{9}
- 26955 = amount of SI days in the average human lifetime of 73.8 calendar years.

=== 27000 to 27999 ===
- 27405 = heptagonal number, hexadecagonal number, 48-gonal number, 80-gonal number, smallest integer that is polygonal in exactly 10 ways.
- 27434 = square pyramidal number
- 27559 = Zeisel number
- 27594 = number of primitive polynomials of degree 19 over GF(2)
- 27648 = 1^{1} × 2^{2} × 3^{3} × 4^{4}
- 27653 = Friedman prime
- 27720 = 25th highly composite number; smallest number divisible by the numbers from 1 to 12 (there is no smaller number divisible by the numbers from 1 to 11 since any number divisible by 3 and 4 must be divisible by 12)
- 27846 = harmonic divisor number

=== 28000 to 28999 ===
- 28158 = pentagonal pyramidal number
- 28374 = smallest integer to start a run of six consecutive integers with the same number of divisors
- 28393 = unique prime in base 13
- 28547 = Friedman prime
- 28559 = nice Friedman prime
- 28561 = 169^{2} = 13^{4} = 119^{2} + 120^{2}, number that is simultaneously a square number and a centered square number, palindromic in base 12: 14641_{12}
- 28595 = octahedral number
- 28657 = Fibonacci prime, Markov prime
- 28900 = 170^{2}, palindromic in base 13: 10201_{13}

=== 29000 to 29999 ===
- 29241 = 171^{2}, sum of the cubes of the first 18 positive integers
- 29341 = Carmichael number
- 29370 = square pyramidal number
- 29527 = Friedman prime
- 29531 = Friedman prime
- 29601 = number of planar partitions of 18

=== Primes ===
There are 983 prime numbers between 20000 and 30000.
