= Pyramidal number =

Figurate number

Geometric representation of the square pyramidal number 1 + 4 + 9 + 16 = 30.

A pyramidal number is the number of points in a pyramid with a polygonal base and triangular sides. The term often refers to square pyramidal numbers, which have a square base with four sides, but it can also refer to a pyramid with any number of sides. The numbers of points in the base and in layers parallel to the base are given by polygonal numbers of the given number of sides, while the numbers of points in each triangular side is given by a triangular number. It is possible to extend the pyramidal numbers to higher dimensions.

== Formula ==
The formula for the nth r-gonal pyramidal number is

$$P_n^r= \frac{3n^2 + n^3(r-2) - n(r-5)}{6},$$

where $r \isin \mathbb{N}$, r ≥ 3.

This formula can be factored:

$$P_n^r=\frac{n(n+1)\bigl(n(r-2)-(r-5)\bigr)}{(2)(3)}=\left(\frac{n(n+1)}{2}\right)\left(\frac{n(r-2)-(r-5)}{3}\right)=T_n \cdot \frac{n(r-2)-(r-5)}{3},$$

where T_{n} is the nth triangular number.

== Sequences ==
The first few triangular pyramidal numbers (equivalently, tetrahedral numbers) are:

1, 4, 10, 20, 35, 56, 84, 120, 165, 220, ... (sequence A000292 in the OEIS)

The first few square pyramidal numbers are:

1, 5, 14, 30, 55, 91, 140, 204, 285, 385, 506, 650, 819, ... (sequence A000330 in the OEIS).

The first few pentagonal pyramidal numbers are:

1, 6, 18, 40, 75, 126, 196, 288, 405, 550, 726, 936, 1183, ... (sequence A002411 in the OEIS).

The first few hexagonal pyramidal numbers are:

1, 7, 22, 50, 95, 161, 252, 372, 525, 715, 946, 1222, 1547, 1925 (sequence A002412 in the OEIS).

The first few heptagonal pyramidal numbers are:

1, 8, 26, 60, 115, 196, 308, 456, 645, 880, 1166, 1508, 1911, ... (sequence A002413 in the OEIS)
