= 30,000 =

← 29999	30000	30001 →
- List of numbers; Integers; ← 0 10k 20k 30k 40k 50k 60k 70k 80k 90k →
- Cardinal: thirty thousand
- Ordinal: 30000th (thirty thousandth)
- Factorization: 2^{4} × 3 × 5^{4}
- Greek numeral: $\stackrel{\gamma}{\Mu}$
- Roman numeral: X̅X̅X̅, x̅x̅x̅
- Binary: 111010100110000_{2}
- Ternary: 1112011010_{3}
- Senary: 350520_{6}
- Octal: 72460_{8}
- Duodecimal: 15440_{12}
- Hexadecimal: 7530_{16}

30,000 (thirty thousand) is the natural number that comes after 29,999 and before 30,001.

== Selected numbers in the range 30001–39999 ==
=== 30001 to 30999 ===
- 30029 = primorial prime
- 30030 = primorial
- 30031 = smallest composite number which is one more than a primorial
- 30203 = safe prime
- 30240 = harmonic divisor number, smallest 4-perfect number
- 30323 = Sophie Germain prime and safe prime
- 30420 = pentagonal pyramidal number
- 30537 = Riordan number
- 30694 = open meandric number
- 30941 = first base 13 repunit prime

=== 31000 to 31999 ===
- 31116 = octahedral number
- 31185 = number of partitions of 39
- 31337 = cousin prime, pronounced elite, an alternate way to spell 1337, an obfuscated alphabet made with numbers and punctuation, known and used in the gamer, hacker, and BBS cultures.
- 31395 = square pyramidal number
- 31397 = prime number followed by a record prime gap of 72, the first greater than 52
- 31688 = the number of years approximately equal to 1 trillion seconds
- 31721 = start of a prime quadruplet

=== 32000 to 32999 ===
- 32043 = smallest number whose square is pandigital.
- 32045 = can be expressed as a sum of two squares in more ways than any smaller number.
- 32760 = harmonic divisor number
- 32761 = 181^{2}, centered hexagonal number
- 32767 = 2^{15} − 1, largest positive value for a signed (two's complement) 16-bit integer on a computer.
- 32768 = 2^{15} = 8^{5} = 32^{3}, maximum absolute value of a negative value for a signed (two's complement) 16-bit integer on a computer.
- 32800 = pentagonal pyramidal number
- 32993 = Leyland prime using 2 & 15 (2^{15} + 15^{2})

=== 33000 to 33999 ===
- 33461 = Pell number, Markov number
- 33511 = square pyramidal number
- 33781 = octahedral number

=== 34000 to 34999 ===
- 34560 = 5 superfactorial
- 34790 = number of non-isomorphic set-systems of weight 13.
- 34841 = start of a prime quadruplet
- 34969 = 187^{2}, favorite number of the Muppet character Count von Count

=== 35000 to 35999 ===
- 35720 = square pyramidal number
- 35890 = tribonacci number
- 35899 = alternating factorial
- 35964 = digit-reassembly number

=== 36000 to 36999 ===
- 36100 = sum of the cubes of the first 19 positive integers
- 36594 = octahedral number

=== 37000 to 37999 ===
- 37338 = number of partitions of 40
- 37378 = semi-meandric number
- 37634 = third term of the Lucas–Lehmer sequence
- 37666 = Markov number
- 37926 = pentagonal pyramidal number

=== 38000 to 38999 ===
- 38024 = square pyramidal number
- 38305 = the largest Forges-compatible number (for index 32) to the field $\mathbb{Q}(\sqrt{6}, \sqrt{14})$. But a conjecture of Viggo Brun predicts that there are infinitely many such numbers for any Galois field $F$ unless $F$ is bad.
- 38501 = Smallest prime separated by at least 40 from the nearest primes (38461 and 38543). It is thus an isolated prime. Chen prime.
- 38807 = number of non-equivalent ways of expressing 10,000,000 as the sum of two prime numbers
- 38962 = Kaprekar number

=== 39000 to 39999 ===
- 39299 = Integer connected with coefficients in expansion of Weierstrass P-function
- 39559 = octahedral number
- 39648 = tetranacci number

=== Primes ===
There are 958 prime numbers between 30,000 and 40,000.
