= 40,000 =

← 39999	40000	40001 →
- List of numbers; Integers; ← 0 10k 20k 30k 40k 50k 60k 70k 80k 90k →
- Cardinal: forty thousand
- Ordinal: 40000th (forty thousandth)
- Factorization: 2^{6} × 5^{4}
- Divisors: 35 total
- Greek numeral: $\stackrel{\delta}{\Mu}$
- Roman numeral: X̅L̅, x̅l̅
- Binary: 1001110001000000_{2}
- Ternary: 2000212111_{3}
- Senary: 505104_{6}
- Octal: 116100_{8}
- Duodecimal: 1B194_{12}
- Hexadecimal: 9C40_{16}

40,000 (forty thousand) is the natural number that comes after 39,999 and before 40,001. It is the square of 200.

== Selected numbers in the range 40001–49999 ==
=== 40001 to 40999 ===
- 40320 = smallest factorial (8!) that is not a highly composite number
- 40425 = square pyramidal number
- 40585 = largest factorion
- 40678 = pentagonal pyramidal number
- 40755 = the smallest number >1 to be a Triangular number, Pentagonal number, and a Hexagonal number.
- 40804 = palindromic square

=== 41000 to 41999 ===
- 41041 = Carmichael number
- 41472 = 3-smooth number, number of reduced trees with 24 nodes
- 41586 = Large Schröder number
- 41616 = triangular square number
- 41835 = Motzkin number

=== 42000 to 42999 ===
- 42680 = octahedral number
- 42925 = square pyramidal number

=== 43000 to 43999 ===
- 43261 = Markov number
- 43380 = number of nets of a dodecahedron
- 43390 = number of primes $\leq 2^{19}$.
- 43560 = pentagonal pyramidal number
- 43691 = Wagstaff prime
- 43777 = smallest member of a prime sextuplet

=== 44000 to 44999 ===
- 44044 = palindrome of 79 after 6 iterations of the "reverse and add" iterative process
- 44100 = sum of the cubes of the first 20 positive integers 44,100 Hz is a common sampling frequency in digital audio (and is the standard for compact discs).
- 44583 = number of partitions of 41
- 44721 = smallest positive integer such that the expression 1/n − 1/(n + 2) ≤ 10^{−9}
- 44724 = maximum number of days in which a human being has been verified to live (Jeanne Calment).
- 44944 = palindromic square

=== 45000 to 45999 ===
- 45360 = 26th highly composite number; smallest number with exactly 100 factors (including one and itself)

=== 46000 to 46999 ===
- 46080 = double factorial of 12
- 46233 = sum of the first eight factorials
- 46249 = 2nd number that can be written as $a^2+b!$ in 3 ways
- 46368 = Fibonacci number
- 46656 = 216^{2} = 36^{3} = 6^{6}, 3-smooth number
- 46657 = Carmichael number
- 46972 = number of prime knots with 14 crossings

=== 47000 to 47999 ===
- 47058 = primary pseudoperfect number
- 47160 = 10-th derivative of x^{x} at x=1
- 47321/33461 ≈ √2

=== 48000 to 48999 ===
- 48629 = number of trees with 17 unlabeled nodes
- 48734 = number of 22-bead necklaces (turning over is allowed) where complements are equivalent

=== 49000 to 49999 ===
- 49151 = Woodall number
- 49152 = 3-smooth number
- 49726 = pentagonal pyramidal number
- 49940 = number of 21-bead binary necklaces with beads of 2 colors where the colors may be swapped but turning over is not allowed

=== Primes ===
There are 930 prime numbers between 40000 and 50000.
