= 50,000 =

| ← 49999 | 50000 | 50001 → |
- List of numbers; Integers; ← 0 10k 20k 30k 40k 50k 60k 70k 80k 90k →
- Cardinal: fifty thousand
- Ordinal: 50000th (fifty thousandth)
- Factorization: 2^{4} × 5^{5}
- Greek numeral: $\stackrel{\epsilon}{\Mu}$
- Roman numeral: L̅, l̅
- Unicode symbol: ↇ
- Binary: 1100001101010000_{2}
- Ternary: 2112120212_{3}
- Senary: 1023252_{6}
- Octal: 141520_{8}
- Duodecimal: 24B28_{12}
- Hexadecimal: C350_{16}

50,000 (fifty thousand) is the natural number that comes after 49,999 and before 50,001.

== Selected numbers in the range 50001–59999 ==
=== 50001 to 50999 ===
- 50069 = 1^{1} + 2^{2} + 3^{3} + 4^{4} + 5^{5} + 6^{6}
- 50400 = 27th highly composite number
- 50625 = 15^{4}, smallest fourth power that can be expressed as the sum of only five distinct fourth powers, palindromic in base 14 (14641_{14})
- 50653 = 37^{3}, palindromic in base 6 (1030301_{6})

=== 51000 to 51999 ===
- 51076 = 226^{2}, palindromic in base 15 (10201_{15})
- 51641 = Markov number
- 51984 = 228^{2} = 37^{3} + 11^{3}, the smallest square to the sum of only five distinct fourth powers.

=== 52000 to 52999 ===
- 52488 = 3-smooth number
- 52633 = Carmichael number

=== 53000 to 53999 ===
- 53016 = pentagonal pyramidal number
- 53174 = number of partitions of 42
- 53361 = 231^{2} sum of the cubes of the first 21 positive integers

=== 54000 to 54999 ===
- 54688 = 2-automorphic number
- 54748 = narcissistic number
- 54872 = 38^{3}, palindromic in base 9 (83238_{9})
- 54901 = chiliagonal number

=== 55000 to 55999 ===
- 55296 = 3-smooth number
- 55440 = the 9th superior highly composite number; the 9th colossally abundant number, the 28th highly composite number.
- 55459 = one of five remaining Seventeen or Bust numbers in the Sierpinski problem
- 55860 = harmonic divisor number
- 55987 = repunit prime in base 6

=== 56000 to 56999 ===
- 56011 = Wedderburn-Etherington number
- 56092 = the number of groups of order 256, see
- 56169 = 237^{2}, palindromic in octal (15551_{8})
- 56448 = pentagonal pyramidal number

=== 57000 to 57999 ===
- 57121 = 239^{2}, palindromic in base 14 (16B61_{14})

=== 58000 to 58999 ===
- 58081 = 241^{2}, palindromic in base 15 (12321_{15})
- 58367 = smallest integer that cannot be expressed as a sum of fewer than 1079 tenth powers
- 58786 = Catalan number
- 58800 = initial number of first century xx00 to xx99 containing as few as three prime numbers {58831, 58889, 58897}
- 58921 = Friedman prime

=== 59000 to 59999 ===
- 59049 = 243^{2} = 9^{5} = 3^{10}
- 59051 = Friedman prime
- 59053 = Friedman prime
- 59081 = Zeisel number
- 59263 = Friedman prime
- 59273 = Friedman prime
- 59536 = 244^{2}, palindromic in base 11 (40804_{11})

=== Primes ===
There are 924 prime numbers between 50000 and 60000.
