= 90,000 =

← 89999	90000	90001 →
- List of numbers; Integers; ← 0 10k 20k 30k 40k 50k 60k 70k 80k 90k →
- Cardinal: ninety thousand
- Ordinal: 90000th (ninety thousandth)
- Factorization: 2^{4} × 3^{2} × 5^{4}
- Divisors: 1, 2, 3, 4, 5, 6, 8, 9, 10, 12, 15, 16, 18, 20, 24, 25, 30, 36, 40, 45, 48, 50, 60, 72, 75, 80, 90, 100, 120, 125, 144, 150, 180, 200, 225, 240, 250, 300, 360, 375, 400, 450, 500, 600, 625, 720, 750, 900, 1000, 1125, 1200, 1250, 1500, 1800, 1875, 2000, 2250, 2500, 3000, 3600, 3750, 4500, 5000, 5625, 6000, 7500, 9000, 10000, 11250, 15000, 18000, 22500, 30000, 45000, 90000
- Greek numeral: $\stackrel{\theta}{\Mu}$
- Roman numeral: X̅C̅, x̅c̅
- Binary: 10101111110010000_{2}
- Ternary: 11120110100_{3}
- Senary: 1532400_{6}
- Octal: 257620_{8}
- Duodecimal: 44100_{12}
- Hexadecimal: 15F90_{16}

90,000 (ninety thousand) is the natural number following 89,999 and preceding 90,001.

== In mathematics ==
90,000 can be written as the sum of the cubes of the first 24 positive integers, and is the square of 300. The aliquot sum of 90,000 is 224,743, since 224,743 is greater than 90,000, it is an abundant number.

== Selected numbers in the range 90,000–99,999 ==
- 90,625 = the only five-digit automorphic number: 90625^{2} = 8212890625
- 91,125 = 45^{3}
- 91,144 = Fine number
- 92,205 = number of 23-bead necklaces (turning over is allowed) where complements are equivalent
- 93,312 = Leyland number: 6^{6} + 6^{6}. Also a 3-smooth number.
- 94,249 = palindromic square: 307^{2}
- 94,932 = Leyland number: 7^{5} + 5^{7}
- 95,121 = Kaprekar number: 95121^{2} = 9048004641; 90480 + 04641 = 95121
- 95,040 = the order of the Mathieu group M_{1}_{2}
- 95,420 = number of 22-bead binary necklaces with beads of 2 colors where the colors may be swapped but turning over is not allowed
- 96,557 = Markov number: 5^{2} + 6466^{2} + 96557^{2} = 3 × 5 × 6466 × 96557
- 97,336 = 46^{3}, the largest 5-digit cube
- 98,304 = 3-smooth number
- 98,980 = year in which the Gregorian calendar will begin to differ from the tropical year by one-twelfth of a tropical year. In other words, it is the year in which the calendar year will have about a one month offset from the equinoxes.
- 99,066 = largest number whose square uses all of the decimal digits once: 99066^{2} = 9814072356. It is also strobogrammatic in decimal.
- 99,551 = prime p such that p is k-th prime and p ends in k. 17 also has this property.
- 99,719 = The largest five-digit number that is a left-and-right-truncatable prime
- 99,856 = 316^{2}, the largest 5-digit square
- 99,991 = largest five-digit prime number
- 99,999 = repdigit, Kaprekar number: 99999^{2} = 9999800001; 99998 + 00001 = 99999

=== Primes ===
There are 879 prime numbers between 90000 and 100000.
