= 80,000 =

← 79999	80000	80001 →
- List of numbers; Integers; ← 0 10k 20k 30k 40k 50k 60k 70k 80k 90k →
- Cardinal: eighty thousand
- Ordinal: 80000th (eighty thousandth)
- Factorization: 2^{7} × 5^{4}
- Greek numeral: $\stackrel{\eta}{\Mu}$
- Roman numeral: L̅X̅X̅X̅, l̅x̅x̅x̅
- Binary: 10011100010000000_{2}
- Ternary: 11001201222_{3}
- Senary: 1414212_{6}
- Octal: 234200_{8}
- Duodecimal: 3A368_{12}
- Hexadecimal: 13880_{16}

80,000 (eighty thousand) is the natural number after 79,999 and before 80,001.

== In mathematics ==
80,000 is an odd composite number, that is a regular number.

== In other fields ==
Since January 2024, the daily URL save limit for YouTube for the Wayback Machine is 80,000.

== Selected numbers in the range 80,000–89,999 ==
- 80,782 = Pell number P_{14}
- 81,081 = smallest abundant number ending in 1, 3, 7, or 9
- 81,181 = number of reduced trees with 25 nodes
- 82,000 = the only currently known number greater than 1 that can be written in bases from 2 through 5 using only 0s and 1s.
- 82,025 = number of primes $\leq 2^{20}$.
- 82,467 = number of square (0,1)-matrices without zero rows and with exactly 6 entries equal to 1
- 82,656 = Kaprekar number: 82656^{2} = 6832014336; 68320 + 14336 = 82656
- 82,944 = 3-smooth number: 2^{10} × 3^{4}
- 83,097 = Riordan number
- 83,160 = the 29th highly composite number
- 83,357 = Friedman prime
- 84,672 = number of primitive polynomials of degree 21 over GF(2)
- 85,085 = product of five consecutive primes: 5 × 7 × 11 × 13 × 17
- 87,360 = unitary perfect number
- 88,789 = the start of a prime 9-tuple, along with 88793, 88799, 88801, 88807, 88811, 88813, 88817, and 88819.
- 89,134 = number of partitions of 45

=== Primes ===
There are 876 prime numbers between 80,000 and 90,000.

== See also ==
- 80,000 Hours, a British social impact career advisory organization
