= 70,000 =

← 69999	70000	70001 →
- List of numbers; Integers; ← 0 10k 20k 30k 40k 50k 60k 70k 80k 90k →
- Cardinal: seventy thousand
- Ordinal: 70000th (seventy thousandth)
- Factorization: 2^{4} × 5^{4} × 7
- Greek numeral: $\stackrel{\zeta}{\Mu}$
- Roman numeral: L̅X̅X̅, l̅x̅x̅
- Binary: 10001000101110000_{2}
- Ternary: 10120000121_{3}
- Senary: 1300024_{6}
- Octal: 210560_{8}
- Duodecimal: 34614_{12}
- Hexadecimal: 11170_{16}

70,000 (seventy thousand) is the natural number following 69,999 and preceding 70,001. It is a round number.

== Selected numbers in the range 70001–79999 ==
- 70030 = largest number of digits of π that have been recited from memory
- 71656 = pentagonal pyramidal number
- 72771 = 3 x 127 x 191, is a sphenic number, triangular number, and hexagonal number.
- 73296 = is the smallest number n, for which n−3, n−2, n−1, n+1, n+2, n+3 are all Sphenic number.
- 73440 = 15 × 16 × 17 × 18 (can also be written as 18! ÷ 14! or 18!/14!)
- 73712 = number of n-Queens Problem solutions for n = 13
- 73728 = 3-smooth number
- 74353 = Friedman prime
- 74897 = Friedman prime
- 75025 = Fibonacci number, Markov number
- 75175 = number of partitions of 44
- 75361 = Carmichael number
- 76084 = amicable number with 63020
- 76424 = tetranacci number
- 77778 = Kaprekar number
- 78163 = Friedman prime
- 78498 = the number of primes under 1,000,000
- 78557 = conjectured to be the smallest Sierpiński number
- 78732 = 3-smooth number

=== Primes ===
There are 902 prime numbers between 70000 and 80000.
