= Chelsea Quinn Yarbro bibliography =

This is a list of fiction works by Chelsea Quinn Yarbro, who was awarded a 2009 Bram Stoker Award for Lifetime Achievement. Quinn Yarbro has published under her name and under the pseudonyms of Quinn Fawcett, Trystam Kith, Terry Nelson Bonner, Camille Gabor, and Vanessa Pryor. Quinn Yarbro has also written non-fiction history works under the name of T. C. F. Hopkins.

== Fiction as Chelsea Quinn Yarbro ==
Books are listed in alphabetical order by series, followed by standalone novels, collections, and short stories.

=== Charles Spotted Moon (mystery series) ===
1. Ogilvie, Tallant & Moon (1976)
2. Music When Sweet Voices Die (1979)
3. Poison Fruit (1991)
4. Cat's Claw (1992)

=== Chesterton Holte, Gentleman Haunt (historical mystery/ghost series) ===
1. Haunting Investigation (December 2015)
2. Living Spectres (November 2016)
3. Shining Phantoms (forthcoming)
4. Book #4 (forthcoming)
5. Book #5 (forthcoming)

=== Crisis of Empire (science fiction series) ===
- Crown of Empire (1994, book 4 in the series)

=== Jason Russell (Western series) ===
1. The Law in Charity (1989)
2. Charity, Colorado (1993)
3. The Changes in Charity (forthcoming)

=== The Saint-Germain Cycle (historical horror series) ===
==== Atta Olivia Clemens ====
1. A Flame in Byzantium (1987)
2. Crusader's Torch (1988)
3. A Candle For D'Artagnan (1989)

==== Count of Saint-Germain ====
1. Hôtel Transylvania (1978)
2. The Palace (1978)
3. Blood Games (1980)
4. Path of the Eclipse (1981)
5. Tempting Fate (1982)
6. The Saint-Germain Chronicles (1983, short story collection)
7. Darker Jewels (1993)
8. Better In The Dark (1993)
9. Mansions of Darkness (1996)
10. Writ in Blood (1997)
11. Blood Roses (1998)
12. Communion Blood (1999)
13. Come Twilight (2000)
14. A Feast in Exile (2001)
15. Night Blooming (2002)
16. Midnight Harvest (2003)
17. Dark of the Sun (2004)
18. States of Grace (2005)
19. Roman Dusk (2006)
20. Borne in Blood (2007)
21. Saint-Germain: Memoirs (2007, short story collection)
22. A Dangerous Climate (2008)
23. Burning Shadows (2009)
24. An Embarrassment of Riches (2011)
25. Commedia della Morte (2012)
26. Night Pilgrims (2013)
27. Sustenance (2014)
28. Forgotten Gods (forthcoming)
29. Orphans of Memory (forthcoming)
30. TBD (forthcoming)

==== Count of Saint-Germain short fiction ====
- "Seat Partner" (1979)
- "Cabin 33" (1980)
- "Art Songs'" (1981)
- "The Spider Glass" (1981)
- "Renewal" (1982)
- "A Question of Patronage: A Saint-Germain Story" (1994)
- "Intercession'"(2003)
- "A Gentleman of the Old School" (2005)
- "Harpy" (2007)
- "Lost Epiphany" (2008)
- "Tales Out of School" (2008)

==== Madelaine de Montalia ====
- Out of the House of Life (1990)
- In the Face of Death (2004)

=== The Merchant Prince (fantasy series) ===
- Outrageous Fortune (2002, book 2 in the series, written with Armin Shimerman)

=== Shattered Light (fantasy series) ===
- Dark Light (1999)

=== Sisters of the Night (historical horror series) ===
1. Kelene: The Angry Angel (1998)
2. Fenice: The Soul of an Angel (1999)
3. Zhameni: The Angel of Death (unpublished. This title was one of the many books that were orphaned after a publisher merger, and as the packager owns the copyright, Yarbro is unable to sell the book to a new publisher.)

=== Collections ===
- Cautionary Tales (1978)
- Signs & Portents (1984)
- The Vampire Stories of Chelsea Quinn Yarbro (1994)
- Apprehensions and Other Delusions (2003)

=== Other novels ===
- Time of the Fourth Horseman (1976)
- False Dawn (1978)
- Ariosto (1980)
- Sins of Omission (1980)
- Dead & Buried (1980)
- A Taste of Wine (1982, as "Vanessa Pryor")
- Hyacinths (1983)
- The Godforsaken (1983)
- The Making of Australia #5: The Outback (1983, as "Terry Nelson Bonner")
- Locadio's Apprentice (1984)
- Nomads (1984)
- Four Horses for Tishtry (1985)
- A Mortal Glamour (1985)
- To the High Redoubt (1985)
- A Baroque Fable (1986)
- Floating Illusions (1986)
- Firecode (1987)
- Taji's Syndrome (1988)
- Beastnights (1989)
- Monet's Ghost (1997)
- Magnificat (1999)
- Alas, Poor Yorick (2002)
- Arcane Wisdome (2014)
- The Case of the Discrete Madame (2019)

=== Omnibus ===
- Science Fiction Special 40 (1982)

=== Anthologies ===
- Two Views of Wonder (1973, with Thomas N. Scortia)
- Strangers in the Night (1995, with Anne Stuart and Maggie Shayne)

==== The Gate of Worlds ====
- An Exaltation of Spiders (1991) [SF]
- Beyond the Gate of Worlds (1991, with Robert Silverberg and John Brunner)

=== Chapterbooks ===
- The Spider Glass (1991)

=== Short fiction series ===
==== The Harriers ====
1. Of War and Codes and Honor (1991, with Gordon R. Dickson)
2. Down Among the Dead Men (1993, with Gordon R. Dickson)

=== Select short fiction ===
- The Posture of Prophecy (1969)
- Frog Pond (1971)
- A Time of the Fourth Horseman (1972)
- False Dawn (1972)
- Everything that Begins with an "M" (1972)
- The Ghosts at Iron River (1973)
- The Meaning of the Word (1973)
- Un Bel Di (1973)
- Who Is Sylvia? (1974, with Thomas N. Scortia)
- Training Twofoots (1974)
- Into My Own (1975)
- Dead in Irons (1976)
- Lammas Night (1976)
- The Fellini Beggar (1976)
- Allies (1977)
- The Generalissimo's Butterfly (1978)
- Space/Time Arabesque (1978)
- Disturb Not My Slumbering Fair (1978)
- Swan Song (1978)
- Best Interests (1978)
- Fugitive Colors (1979)
- Savory, Sage, Rosemary, and Thyme (1981)
- On St. Hubert's Thing (1982) (Illustrated by Alicia Austin)
- The Arrows (1983)
- Coasting (1983)
- Depth of Focus (1984)
- Do Not Forsake Me, O My Darlin' (1984)
- The End of the Carnival (1984)
- Night Catch (1985)
- Do I Dare to Eat a Peach? (1985)
- Such Nice Neighbors (1985)
- Lapses (1987)
- Night Mare (1988)
- Durga Hajit (1988)
- Cold Supper (1990)
- Fruits of Love (1990)
- Day 17 (1990)
- Become So Shining That We Cease to Be (1991)
- Confession of a Madman (1991)
- Tarnhelms (1991)
- Advocates (1991, with Suzy McKee Charnas)
- A Writ of Habeas Corpus (1991)
- Salome (1991)
- Novena (1992)
- Echoes (1993)
- The Creatures That Walked in Darkness (1993)
- Whiteface (1993)
- Restoration Comedy (1993)
- Do Not Pass Go Do Not Collect $200 (1994)
- Catching Dreams (1995)
- Tin Lizzies (1995)
- In the Face of Death (2000)
- Giotto's Window (2000)
- Traditional Values (2001)
- Long-Term Investment (2001)
- Siren Song (2002)
- Inappropriate Laughter (2002)
- Renfield's Syndrome (2002)
- Fugues (2003)
- The Ice Prince (2003)
- Sugar Skulls (2005)
- A New Interpretation of the Liggerzun Text (2006, with Edgar Allan Poe)
- Miss Faversham's Room (2007)
- Endra: From Memory (2008)
- Trial Run (2008)
- Genius Loci (2008)
- And Bob's Your Uncle (2010)
- Thy Spinning Wheel Complete (2010)
- Quadruple Whammy (2013)
- Call It Only (2020)
- A Case of Mistaken Identity (2020)
- To Sing with the Choir Invisible (2021)

=== Poetry ===
- An Indulgence (1978)
- Untitled (contained in Cautionary Tales) (1978)

== Nonfiction ==
=== The Michael books ===
- Messages from Michael On the Nature of the Evolution of the Human Soul (1979, revised 25th Anniversary Edition 2005)
- More Messages from Michael (March 1986)
- Michael's People (July 1988)
- Michael for the Millennium (1995)

See main article

=== Other nonfiction ===
- Fine-Tuning Fiction (2013)

=== Short nonfiction ===
- Letter (1968)
- Chicken in Port Wine Sauce (1973)
- Favorite Picnic for the Beach (1973)
- Panukakua (1973)
- Stuffed Cabbage (1973)
- The Out-of-Door Wonder (1973)
- Wassaii (1973)
- "Vive Laquelle Difference?" (1973, with Thomas N. Scortia)
- Story notes for stories collected in Cautionary Tales (1978)
- On the Demon Lover (1978)
- A Word of Caution (1978)
- Gloriana Excelsus (1979)
- Cinderella's Revenge: Twists on Fairy Tale and Mythic Themes in the Work of Stephen King (1982)
- Why is the Horror Genre Frowned Upon by the Literary Establishment? (1982)
- My Favorite Enigma: the Historical Comte de Saint-Germain (1983)
- 1983: The Science Fiction Year in Review: Recommended Reading (1984)
- Afterword (1984)
- Letter: On vampires and other things (1985)
- Chelsea Quinn Yarbro: Bibliography (1985)
- Views on Horror and the Limits of Violence (1986)
- Son of the Introduction: The Man Who Wrote... (1987)
- Author's Note (Crusader's Torch) (1988)
- Copyright Infringement Part II (1992)
- On Freaks (1992)
- Introduction: Nancy Kilpatrick: An Appreciation (The Vampire Stories of Nancy Kilpatrick) (2000)
- Author's Note (Night Blooming) (2002)
- Pamela Sargent, Writer (2003)
- Introduction (Fear of the Unknown ) (2005)
- A Tribute to Del Howison (2011)
- Afterword (Graphic Horror: Movie Monster Memories) (2012)
- Author's Note (Night Pilgrims) (2013)
- Annie and Horses (2013)

== As Camille Gabor (later reissued under own name) ==
=== The Vildecaz Talents (fantasy series) ===
1. Nimuar's Loss (2007)
2. Deceptive Oracle (2007)
3. Agnith's Promise (2007)

== As Quinn Fawcett ==
=== Ian Fleming books (historical thriller series) ===
- Death to Spies (2002, ISBN 978-0-312-86930-4)

=== Mme. Vernet books (historical mystery series) ===
- Napoleon Must Die (1993, ISBN 0-380-76541-1)
- Death Wears a Crown (1993, ISBN 0-380-76542-X)

=== Mycroft Holmes (historical mystery series) ===
1. Against the Brotherhood (1997, with Bill Fawcett)
2. Embassy Row (1998, with Bill Fawcett)
3. The Flying Scotsman (1999, with Bill Fawcett)
4. The Scottish Ploy (2001, with Bill Fawcett)

== As T.C.F. Hopkins ==
- Confrontation at Lepanto: Christendom vs. Islam (2006)
- Empires, Wars, and Battles: The Middle East from Antiquity to the Rise of the New World (2007)

== As Trystam Kith (later reissued under own name) ==
=== Trouble in the Night (horror series) ===
1. A Cold Summer Night (2004)
2. A Bright Winter Sun (2004)
