= 3/7 =

3/7 may refer to:

- March 7 (month-day date notation)
- July 3 (day-month date notation)
- 3rd Battalion, 7th Marines, an infantry battalion of the United States Marine Corps
- 3/7 (number), a fraction
