= 2/7 =

2/7 may refer to:

- February 7 (month-day date notation)
- July 2 (day-month date notation)
- 2nd Battalion, 7th Marines, a light infantry battalion of the United States Marine Corps
- 2/7 (number), a fraction
