= Riso =

Riso may refer to:

== Architecture and museums ==
- Palazzo Riso, a contemporary art museum in Palermo, Italy

== Institutions and corporations ==
- Riso Kagaku Corporation, a Japanese manufacturer of duplicating machines
- Risø National Laboratory, a scientific research organization in Denmark

== People ==
- Don Richard Riso (1946–2012), author of several books on the Enneagram of Personality
