= Janet Levine =

South African-born writer

- Born: South Africa
- Citizenship: American
- Occupations: Writer, activist
- Website: janetlevine.com

Janet Levine is a South African-born writer and journalist, known for her views on social justice issues in South Africa. She served two terms on the Johannesburg City Council and is the author of numerous books on the topics of apartheid and the Enneagram model.

== Biography ==
Levine became an activist against apartheid when she was living in South Africa. She was a member of the Progressive Federal Party and elected to the Johannesburg City Council in 1977. During her time on the Council, she filed motions to open institutions to all races and was actively involved with black trade organizations which led her to launch a black taxi drivers' cooperative. She was a member of the Council until 1984 when she emigrated to the United States. She became an educator where she taught in the English department at Milton Academy from 1986 until 2014.

In 1989, Levine wrote Inside Apartheid: One Woman's Struggle in South Africa. The book is a political memoir about opposition to the apartheid regime. Levine also studied the Enneagram model and in 1999 published The Enneagram Intelligences: Understanding Personality for Effective Teaching and Learning. She followed up with the book Know Your Parenting Personality: How to Use the Enneagram to Become the Best Parent You Can Be in 2003, a book that discusses parenting styles based on a parent's individual personality.

== Bibliography ==
- 1989, Inside Apartheid: One Woman's Struggle in South Africa
- 1999, The Enneagram Intelligences: Understanding Personality for Effective Teaching and Learning
- 2003, Know Your Parenting Personality: How to Use the Enneagram to Become the Best Parent You Can Be
- 2010, Leela's Gift
- 2023, Liv's Secrets
