= 5/7 =

5/7 may refer to:

- May 7 (month-day date notation)
- July 5 (day-month date notation)
- 5/7 (number), a fraction
