= False dawn =

False Dawn may refer to:

- "False Dawn" (short story), by Rudyard Kipling
- False Dawn (Parts One and Two) (The Forties), a 1924 novella by Edith Wharton about New York City in the 1840s
- False Dawn: The Delusions of Global Capitalism, a 1998 book by John N. Gray
- False Dawn, 1978 novel by Chelsea Quinn Yarbro
- Zodiacal light, a faint, roughly triangular glow seen in the night sky
