= 4/7 =

4/7 may refer to:

- April 7 (month-day date notation)
- July 4 (day-month date notation)
- 4/7 (number), a fraction
