= The Michael Teachings =

New Age spiritual doctrine

The Michael Teachings is a body of channeled New Age spiritual doctrine that originated in the early 1970s as a 'conversation' via a Ouija board between members of a spiritual study group in the San Francisco Bay Area and a channeled spiritual entity who became known as 'Michael'. The teachings received from the entity were first published in book form in 1979 as Messages from Michael, by novelist Chelsea Quinn Yarbro, the first in a series of four books by Yarbro chronicling the Bay Area sessions. Since that time, the teachings purportedly from the same entity have continued to accumulate and expand via a growing number of channels based in other locations.

== Summary ==
The core belief of the Michael Teachings is agape (unconditional love) – specifically, teaching people how to love themselves and how to love others through personality understanding methods, communication skills and other practices that encourage deeper self-awareness.

Modern schools of philosophy and psychology represent facets of this system. Readers of Abraham Maslow, Carl Jung, Erik Erikson and Sigmund Freud, as well as others, will find a ring of familiarity there. Elements of this system were being taught in the 1920s by George Gurdjieff, P.D. Ouspensky and later Rodney Collin.

== Expansion of the Teachings ==
Beginning with a few friends gathered in Sarah Chambers' living room seeking answers to their own questions, there are now more than 40 books published about the body of work that came to be called the Michael Teachings. As students became teachers of the material and it moved out of the United States, many of the books about the teachings have been translated into other languages. The work of José and Lena Stevens has been translated into Finnish. Shepherd Hoodwin's books have been translated into Russian, Spanish, Indonesian, Dutch and German. Websites in other countries evolved to cover the material in the United Kingdom, Germany, South Africa, Brazil and Czechia.

== Reception ==
A number of academic scholars have included the Michael Teachings in their research. These include Jon Klimo, Olav Hammer, Michael F. Brown and Mary Meeker Albert.

Jon Klimo, professor of psychology at Argosy U (SFBA campus), and parapsychology author, researched channeling and writes in the introduction to his book Channeling: Investigations on Receiving Information from Paranormal Sources, "I intended for this book to be a balanced and objective treatment of the phenomenon of channeling so that you the reader can make your own judgements." He goes on to say "Although, as we shall see, channeling has been around since the beginning of recorded history, it is enjoying a remarkable resurgence today."

Professor Klimo stated that the Messages from Michael book series helped to make Michael-channeling into one of the best-known examples of channeling during the 1970s and early 1980s, and noted similarities in the events of the initial Michael channeling sessions to those that led to the Seth Material. Klimo reported that more than a dozen people in the San Francisco Bay Area claimed to channel the same "Michael", using a variety of methods, ranging from automatic writing to speaking while in a trance.

Olav Hammer, an expert on new religious movements, describes the Michael Teachings as a "fairly well-structured set of doctrines, expressed in a distinct vocabulary". According to Hammer, Michael is described by believers as a "group soul, a collective consciousness of 1050 essences". Hammer states that the channelers of Michael study the earlier "transmissions" and use similar terminology, making it easier for readers to accept the new material as part of a doctrine. Dr. Hammer has a degree in Computer Science and a Ph.D. from Lund University (Sweden) in History of Religions.

Michael Brown didn't set out to study channeling. An anthropology and Latin American studies professor at Williams College, he was living in Santa Fe temporarily and working on a book about a Peruvian guerrilla movement when he became interested in some drumming from his next door neighbors. Assuming that was an American Indian ceremony, he wanted to learn more. Eventually, he spent five years of research where he tried to make sense of channeling "in an anthropological sense." That research eventually became his book, The Channeling Zone. Brown said the experiences he underwent in his research didn't change his own beliefs. In 2014, Brown was named president of the School for Advanced Research, after shifting into emeritus status as Lambert Professor of Anthropology and Latin American studies at Williams College in Williamstown, Massachusetts.

Nancy Piatkowski, writing in the Journal of American Folklore, reviewed the book The Channeling Zone: American Spirituality in an Anxious Age by Michael F. Brown. Piatkowski writes that "He uses as prime examples the Seth Material and Michael Teachings, which have been copyrighted and published. [...] In The Channeling Zone, Michael Brown has provided us with a lively, easy to read, yet scholarly look into a spiritual movement whose critics see it as Satanic and evil but whose followers are among the best-educated people in the country. Those who seek the guidance of channels are those who have found dissatisfaction with organized religion yet feel the need for the spiritual in a complex and changing society." Nancy Piatkowski was the Archivist of the Episcopal Diocese of Western New York and Archive Coordinator of the Department of Anthropology, Buffalo State College.

Mary Meeker Alber, in her Ph.D. dissertation, compared several different methods of conscious development that included Sri Aurobindo's Integral Yoga, Tibetan Buddhism and reincarnation, as well as essence and personality systems, which include the Fourth Way system (George Gurdjieff), the Arica School founded by Oscar Ichazo, the Michael system teachings and Personnessence™.

Dr. Alber commented on the similarities of the various Essence and Personality systems: "When I asked him [Dr. Jose Stevens] why the Michael teachings and Personessence™ were so strikingly similar to Fourth Way and Arica programs even though the founders claim to be uninformed by the other, he explained that their commonality reflects the underlying truths about consciousness and its development" (p. 166) ... "To test the appeal of the Michael system approach to self-understanding in my community, I developed and taught a workshop at a regional conference that I entitled The Keys to Self-Mastery in which I gave the revised I-MAP introductory presentation to a group of twenty individuals. I also invited José Stevens to conduct an introductory weekend workshop to a group of ten individuals in my community. From these experiences, I have direct awareness of the important insights that this system offers to individuals beyond the integral paradigm originally embodied by the IMAP. Years after these events, participants have expressed an enduring appreciation for the insights they gained about themselves and others, and ask when and how I intend to continue the work" (pp. 373–374). She goes on to compare – in great detail – the Michael Teachings to aspects of the various systems that she reviewed. Dr. Alber is a graduate of Dartmouth College, B.A., Engineering Sciences and Economics; of the Wharton School of Business, MBA, Multinational Management and Management Information Systems; and of the California Institute of Integral Studies, MA, Anthropology, Human and Organizational Change, PhD, Transformative Learning and Change. She is a Co-Founder and the Director of the Education Innovation Collaborative in Nevada.

== Sarah Chambers ==
Sally Jo "Sarah" (McCord) Chambers (1937–1998) was an American teacher. She was born Sally Jo McCord on November 30, 1937, in Cincinnati, Ohio to Elmer Ernest McCord and Dorothy Lee Clark. She died in Santa Fe, New Mexico, on December 8, 1998. As a teenager, she lived in Michigan, then later lived for a time in Orange County, CA In 1961, she married her first husband, Walter James Polhemus, in Kansas; they divorced in Solano County, California in 1968

In 1972, she married Richard "Dick" Chambers in Oakland, California. Together, they were involved in early groups studying the Fourth Way school of the late mystic George Ivanovich Gurdjieff in Oakland. After leaving those Gurdjieff groups, they started hosting meetings of friends at their home in Oakland. Starting in August 1973 and via a Ouija board, Sarah Chambers "brought through" information about personality and how to get along better in the world in answer to questions that members of the group asked.

Starting in the early 1970s, Sarah had been meeting in a small study group along with Alice Hannah, their husbands (both named Richard) and other close friends who were interested in more advanced spiritual study. Friends invited friends to the groups. Some stayed for a time and many others just passed through. Over the years the group existed, the core of what has become known today as "the Michael Teachings" was revealed. Alice Hannah, "secretary" for the original Michael study group in the early 1970s, kept the group's records and created transcripts of their sessions. The information they brought forth provides the foundation of the body of knowledge, which has now expanded as more teachers are trained and students develop more advanced skills. As advanced students progress in their awareness and needs, new levels of information are being revealed that deepen and broaden the original work.

One concern of the early group was how they would be perceived by others as many of them were professionals such as doctors, lawyers, teachers, scientists, psychologists, community leaders and business people. Channeling and spiritual subjects at the time were not considered "mainstream" activities. In 1995, Sarah answered some questions about why the groups stopped. She recounted that "their meetings in the beginning — and I'm sure Alice & Dick feel this way too — were fun and they were like big family gatherings. Quite often, there were 18–20 people staying here at the house on the weekends for mega-sessions. No money ever changed hands, since Michael always said the teaching would pay for itself. Then, in 1976, the atmosphere changed ... I just lost interest, that's all and went on to other things. I miss the camaraderie very much. There was a tightness in the group that made it stick together. We came to the meetings, whether they were here or at Alice & Dick's, with potluck dishes and stayed until early in the morning. Those sessions went on for many hours with breaks for dinner and, sometimes, breakfast."

Around that same time, Sarah took a full-time job and her interests changed to other things. During that time, she encountered Chelsea Quinn Yarbro, an author and fiction writer who had heard about Sarah's groups. Some of the early transcripts of the groups were used in Yarbro's books Messages from Michael and More Messages from Michael Yarbro's book Michael's People gives accounts of the people involved in the early study groups.

Public domain transcripts of Sarah's early groups have been published by the non-profit Center for Michael Teachings in three volumes in a series called The Legacy of Sarah Chambers.

After Sarah stopped hosting the large public groups, a student of hers, Leslie Briggs, hosted her own groups, starting in 1974 and continuing until 1983. Transcribed sessions from Briggs that have survived have been published by the Center for Michael Teachings.

In the mid-1990s, Sarah Chambers returned to channeling and the Michael Teachings. In 1996, she attended a conference of 16 Michael channels in Colorado. She stayed involved and allowed her name to be used publicly until her death in 1998 at age 61.

== The Legacy of Sarah Chambers books ==
- Center for Michael Teachings (2013). Michael Speaks: The Legacy of Sarah Chambers (Volume 1), ISBN 978-1300-487241.
- Center for Michael Teachings (2013). Michael Speaks: The Legacy of Sarah Chambers (Volume 2), ISBN 978-1300-515203.
- Center for Michael Teachings (2016). Michael Speaks: The Legacy of Sarah Chambers (Volume 3), ISBN 978-1329-165663.

== See also ==
- Seth Material
- Ramtha
