= Transposable integer =

Number that permute or shift cyclically when multiplied by another number

In mathematics, the transposable integers are integers that permute or shift cyclically when they are multiplied by another integer $n$. Examples are:

- 142857 × 3 = 428571 (shifts cyclically one place left)
- 142857 × 5 = 714285 (shifts cyclically one place right)
- 128205 × 4 = 512820 (shifts cyclically one place right)
- 076923 × 9 = 692307 (shifts cyclically two places left)

These transposable integers can be but are not always cyclic numbers. The characterization of such numbers can be done using repeating decimals (and thus the related fractions), or directly.

== General ==
For any integer coprime to 10, its reciprocal is a repeating decimal without any non-recurring digits. E.g. 1/143 = 0.0̅0̅6̅9̅9̅3̅0069930̅0̅6̅9̅9̅3̅...

While the expression of a single series with vinculum on top is adequate, the intention of the above expression is to show that the six cyclic permutations of 006993 can be obtained from this repeating decimal if we select six consecutive digits from the repeating decimal starting from different digits.

This illustrates that cyclic permutations are somehow related to repeating decimals and the corresponding fractions.

The greatest common divisor (gcd) between any cyclic permutation of an m-digit integer and 10^{m} − 1 is constant. Expressed as a formula,

$$\gcd\left(N,10^m-1\right)=\gcd\left(N_c,10^m-1\right),$$

where N is an m-digit integer; and N_{c} is any cyclic permutation of N.

For example,

   gcd(091575, 999999) = gcd(32×52×11×37, 33×7×11×13×37)
                       = 3663
                       = gcd(915750, 999999)
                       = gcd(157509, 999999)
                       = gcd(575091, 999999)
                       = gcd(750915, 999999)
                       = gcd(509157, 999999)

If N is an m-digit integer, the number N_{c}, obtained by shifting N to the left cyclically, can be obtained from:

$$N_c = 10 N - d\left(10^m-1\right), \,$$

where d is the first digit of N and m is the number of digits.

This explains the above common gcd and the phenomenon is true in any base if 10 is replaced by b, the base.

The cyclic permutations are thus related to repeating decimals, the corresponding fractions, and divisors of 10^{m}−1. For examples the related fractions to the above cyclic permutations are thus:

- 091575/999999, 915750/999999, 157509/999999, 575091/999999, 750915/999999, and 509157/999999.

Reduced to their lowest terms using the common gcd, they are:

- 25/273, 250/273, 43/273, 157/273, 205/273, and 139/273.

That is, these fractions when expressed in lowest terms, have the same denominator. This is true for cyclic permutations of any integer.

== Fraction method ==
=== Integral multiplier ===
An integral multiplier refers to the multiplier n being an integer:

1. An integer X shift right cyclically by k positions when it is multiplied by an integer n. X is then the repeating digits of 1/F, whereby F is F_{0} = n 10^{k} − 1 (F_{0} is coprime to 10), or a factor of F_{0}; excluding any values of F which are not more than n.
2. An integer X shift left cyclically by k positions when it is multiplied by an integer n. X is then the repeating digits of 1/F, whereby F is F_{0} = 10^{k} - n, or a factor of F_{0}; excluding any values of F which are not more than n and which are not coprime to 10.

It is necessary for F to be coprime to 10 in order that 1/F is a repeating decimal without any preceding non-repeating digits (see multiple sections of Repeating decimal). If there are digits not in a period, then there is no corresponding solution.

For these two cases, multiples of X, i.e. (j X) are also solutions provided that the integer i satisfies the condition (n j)/F < 1. Most often it is convenient to choose the smallest F that fits the above. The solutions can be expressed by the formula:

$$X = j \frac {10^p-1}{F}$$
where p is a period length of 1/F; and F is a factor of F_{0} coprime to 10.
E.g, F_{0} = 1260 = 2^{2} × 3^{2} × 5 × 7. The factors excluding 2 and 5 recompose to F = 3^{2} × 7 = 63. Alternatively, strike off all the ending zeros from 1260 to become 126, then divide it by 2 (or 5) iteratively until the quotient is no more divisible by 2 (or 5). The result is also F = 63.

To exclude integers that begin with zeros from the solutions, select an integer j such that j/F > 1/10, i.e. j > F/10.

There is no solution when n > F.

=== Fractional multiplier ===
An integer X shift left cyclically by k positions when it is multiplied by a fraction n/s. X is then the repeating digits of s/F, whereby F is F_{0} = s 10^{k} - n, or a factor of F_{0}; and F must be coprime to 10.

For this third case, multiples of X, i.e. (j X) are again solutions but the condition to be satisfied for integer j is that (n j)/F < 1. Again it is convenient to choose the smallest F that fits the above.

The solutions can be expressed by the formula:

$$X = j s \frac {10^p-1}{F}$$
where p is defined likewise; and F is made coprime to 10 by the same process as before.

To exclude integers that begin with zeros from the solutions, select an integer j such that (j s)/F > 1/10, i.e. j > F/10s.

Again if (j s)/F > 1, there is no solution.

== Direct representation ==
The direct algebra approach to the above cases integral multiplier lead to the following formula:

1. $X=D \frac {10^m-1}{n10^k-1},$
  where m is the number of digits of X, and D, the k-digit number shifted from the low end of X to the high end of n X, satisfies D < 10^{k}.
  If the numbers are not to have leading zeros, then n 10^{k − 1} ≤ D.
2. $X = D \frac {10^m-1}{10^k-n},$
  where m is the number of digits of X, and D, the k-digit number shifted from the high end of X to the low end of n X, satisfies:
  1. $D<\frac {10^k} n - 1,$
  2. and the 10-part (the product of the terms corresponding to the primes 2 and 5 of the factorization) of 10^{k} − n divides D.
    The 10-part of an integer t is often abbreviated $\operatorname{gcd}\left(10^\infty,t\right).$
  If the numbers are not to have leading zeros, then 10^{k − 1} ≤ D.

== Cyclic permutation by multiplication ==
A long division of 1 by 7 gives:

        0.142857...
    7 ) 1.000000
         .7
          3
          28
           2
           14
            6
            56
             4
             35
              5
              49
               1

At the last step, 1 reappears as the remainder. The cyclic remainders are {1, 3, 2, 6, 4, 5}. We rewrite the quotients with the corresponding dividend/remainders above them at all the steps:

    Dividend/Remainders    1 3 2 6 4 5
    Quotients              1 4 2 8 5 7

and also note that:

- 1/7 = 0.142857...
- 3/7 = 0.428571...
- 2/7 = 0.285714...
- 6/7 = 0.857142...
- 4/7 = 0.571428...
- 5/7 = 0.714285...

By observing the remainders at each step, we can thus perform a desired cyclic permutation by multiplication. E.g.,

- The integer 142857, corresponding to remainder 1, permutes to 428571 when multiplied by 3, the corresponding remainder of the latter.
- The integer 142857, corresponding to remainder 1, permutes to 857142 when multiplied by 6, the corresponding remainder of the latter.
- The integer 857142, corresponding to remainder 6, permutes to 571428 when multiplied by 5/6; i.e. divided by 6 and multiplied by 5, the corresponding remainder of the latter.

In this manner, cyclical left or right shift of any number of positions can be performed.

Less importantly, this technique can be applied to any integer to shift cyclically right or left by any given number of places for the following reason:

- Every repeating decimal can be expressed as a rational number (fraction).
- Every integer, when added with a decimal point in front and concatenated with itself infinite times, can be converted to a fraction, e.g. we can transform 123456 in this manner to 0.123456123456..., which can thus be converted to fraction 123456/999999. This fraction can be further simplified but it will not be done here.
- To permute the integer 123456 to 234561, all one needs to do is to multiply 123456 by 234561/123456. This looks like cheating but if 234561/123456 is a whole number (in this case it is not), the mission is completed.

== Proof of formula for cyclical right shift operation ==
An integer X shift cyclically right by k positions when it is multiplied by an integer n. Prove its formula.

Proof

First recognize that X is the repeating digits of a repeating decimal, which always possesses cyclic behavior in multiplication. The integer X and its multiple n X then will have the following relationship:

1. The integer X is the repeating digits of the fraction 1/F, say d_{p}d_{p-1}...d_{3}d_{2}d_{1}, where d_{p}, d_{p-1}, ..., d_{3}, d_{2} and d_{1} each represents a digit and p is the number of digits.
2. The multiple n X is thus the repeating digits of the fraction n/F, say d_{k}d_{k-1}...d_{3}d_{2}d_{1}d_{p}d_{p-1}...d_{k+2}d_{k+1}, representing the results after right cyclical shift of k positions.
3. F must be coprime to 10 so that when 1/F is expressed in decimal there is no preceding non-repeating digits otherwise the repeating decimal does not possess cyclic behavior in multiplication.
4. If the first remainder is taken to be n then 1 shall be the (k + 1)st remainder in the long division for n/F in order for this cyclic permutation to take place.
5. In order that n × 10^{k} = 1 (mod F) then F shall be either F_{0} = (n × 10^{k} - 1), or a factor of F_{0}; but excluding any values not more than n and any value having a nontrivial common factor with 10, as deduced above.

This completes the proof.

== Proof of formula for cyclical left shift operation ==
An integer X shift cyclically left by k positions when it is multiplied by an integer n. Prove its formula.

Proof

First recognize that X is the repeating digits of a repeating decimal, which always possesses a cyclic behavior in multiplication. The integer X and its multiple n X then will have the following relationship:

1. The integer X is the repeating digits of the fraction 1/F, say d_{p}d_{p-1}...d_{3}d_{2}d_{1} .
2. The multiple n X is thus the repeating digits of the fraction n/F, say d_{p-k}d_{p-k-1}...d_{3}d_{2}d_{1}d_{p}d_{p-1}...d_{p-k+1},

which represents the results after left cyclical shift of k positions.

1. F must be coprime to 10 so that 1/F has no preceding non-repeating digits otherwise the repeating decimal does not possesses cyclic behavior in multiplication.
2. If the first remainder is taken to be 1 then n shall be the (k + 1)st remainder in the long division for 1/F in order for this cyclic permutation to take place.
3. In order that 1 × 10^{k} = n (mode F) then F shall be either F_{0} = (10^{k} -n), or a factor of F_{0}; but excluding any value not more than n, and any value having a nontrivial common factor with 10, as deduced above.

This completes the proof. The proof for non-integral multiplier such as n/s can be derived in a similar way and is not documented here.

== Shifting an integer cyclically ==
The permutations can be:

- Shifting right cyclically by single position (parasitic numbers);
- Shifting right cyclically by double positions;
- Shifting right cyclically by any number of positions;
- Shifting left cyclically by single position;
- Shifting left cyclically by double positions; and
- Shifting left cyclically by any number of positions

== Parasitic numbers ==
When a parasitic number is multiplied by n, not only it exhibits the cyclic behavior but the permutation is such that the last digit of the parasitic number now becomes the first digit of the multiple. For example, 102564 x 4 = 410256. Note that 102564 is the repeating digits of 4/39 and 410256 the repeating digits of 16/39.

== Shifting right cyclically by double positions ==
An integer X shift right cyclically by double positions when it is multiplied by an integer n. X is then the repeating digits of 1/F, whereby F = n × 10^{2} - 1; or a factor of it; but excluding values for which 1/F has a period length dividing 2 (or, equivalently, less than 3); and F must be coprime to 10.

Most often it is convenient to choose the smallest F that fits the above.

=== Summary of results ===
The following multiplication moves the last two digits of each original integer to the first two digits and shift every other digits to the right:

Multiplier n	Solution	Represented by	Other Solutions
2	0050251256 2814070351 7587939698 4924623115 5778894472 3618090452 2613065326 6331658291 4572864321 608040201	1/199 x 2 = 2/199 period = 99 i.e. 99 repeating digits.	2/199, 3/199, ..., 99/199
3	0033444816 0535117056 8561872909 6989966555 1839464882 9431438127 090301	1/299 x 3 = 3/299 period = 66 299 = 13×23	2/299, 3/299, ..., 99/299 some special cases are illustrated below
3	076923	1/13 x 3 = 3/13 period = 6	2/13, 3/13, 4/13
3	0434782608 6956521739 13	1/23 x 3 = 3/23 period = 22	2/23, 3/23, ..., 7/23
4	0025062656 64160401	1/399 x 4 = 4/399 period = 18 399 = 3×7×19	2/399, 3/399, ..., 99/399 some special cases are illustrated below
4	142857	1/7 x 4 = 4/7 period = 6	-
4	0526315789 47368421	1/19 x 4 = 4/19 period = 18	2/19, 3/19, 4/19
5	(a cyclic number with a period of 498)	1/499 x 5 = 5/499 499 is a full reptend prime	2/499, 3/499, ..., 99/499

Note that:

- 299 = 13 x 23, and the period of 1/299 is accurately determined by the formula, LCM(6, 22) = 66, according to Repeating decimal#Generalization.
- 399 = 3 x 7 x 19, and the period of 1/399 is accurately determined by the formula, LCM(1, 6, 18) = 18.

There are many other possibilities.

== Shifting left cyclically by single position ==
Problem: An integer X shift left cyclically by single position when it is multiplied by 3. Find X.

Solution: First recognize that X is the repeating digits of a repeating decimal, which always possesses some interesting cyclic behavior in multiplications. The integer X and its multiple then will have the following relationship:

- The integer X is the repeating digits of the fraction 1/F, say ab***.
- The multiple is thus the repeating digits of the fraction 3/F, say b***a.
- In order for this cyclic permutation to take place, then 3 shall be the next remainder in the long division for 1/F. Thus F shall be 7 as 1 × 10 ÷ 7 gives remainder 3.

This yields the results that:

X = the repeating digits of 1/7

=142857, and

the multiple = 142857 × 3 = 428571, the repeating digits of 3/7

The other solution is represented by 2/7 x 3 = 6/7:

- 285714 x 3 = 857142

There are no other solutions because:

- Integer n must be the subsequent remainder in a long division of a fraction 1/F. Given that n = 10 - F, and F is coprime to 10 in order for 1/F to be a repeating decimal, then n shall be less than 10.
- For n = 2, F must be 10 - 2 = 8. However 1/8 does not generate a repeating decimal, similarly for n = 5.
- For n = 7, F must be 10 - 7 = 3. However 7 > 3 and 7/3 = 2.333 > 1 and does not fit the purpose.
- Similarly there is no solution for any other integer of n less than 10 except n = 3.

However, if the multiplier is not restricted to be an integer (though ugly), there are many other solutions from this method. E.g., if an integer X shift right cyclically by single position when it is multiplied by 3/2, then 3 shall be the next remainder after 2 in a long division of a fraction 2/F. This deduces that F = 2 x 10 - 3 = 17, giving X as the repeating digits of 2/17, i.e. 1176470588235294, and its multiple is 1764705882352941.

The following summarizes some of the results found in this manner:

Multiplier n/s	Solution	Represented by	Other Solutions
1/2	105263157894736842	2/19 × 1/2 = 1/19 A 2-parasitic number	Other 2-parasitic numbers: 4/19, 6/19, 8/19, 10/19, 12/19, 14/19, 16/19, 18/19
3/2	1176470588235294	2/17 × 3/2 = 3/17	4/17, 6/17, 8/17, 10/17
7/2	153846	2/13 × 7/2 = 7/13	-
9/2	18	2/11 × 9/2 = 9/11	-
7/3	1304347826086956521739	3/23 × 7/3 = 7/23	6/23, 9/23, 12/23, 15/23, 18/23, 21/23
19/4	190476	4/21 × 19/4 = 19/21	-

== Shifting left cyclically by double positions ==
An integer X shift left cyclically by double positions when it is multiplied by an integer n. X is then the repeating digits of 1/F, whereby F is R = 10^{2} - n, or a factor of R; excluding values of F for which 1/F has a period length dividing 2 (or, equivalently, less than 3); and F must be coprime to 10.

Most often it is convenient to choose the smallest F that fits the above.

=== Summary of results ===
The following summarizes some of the results obtained in this manner, where the white spaces between the digits divide the digits into 10-digit groups:

Multiplier n	Solution	Represented by	Other Solutions
2	142857	1/7 × 2 = 2/7	2/7, 3/7
3	0103092783 5051546391 7525773195 8762886597 9381443298 9690721649 4845360824 7422680412 3711340206 185567	1/97 x 3 = 3/97	2/97, 3/97, 4/97, 5/97, ...., 31/97, 32/97
4	No solution	-	-
5	0526315789 47368421	1/19 x 5 = 5/19	2/19, 3/19
6	0212765957 4468085106 3829787234 0425531914 893617	1/47 x 6 = 6/47	2/47, 3/47, 4/47, 5/47, 6/47, 7/47
7	0322580645 16129	1/31 x 7 = 7/31	2/31, 3/31, 4/31 1/93, 2/93, 4/93, 5/93, 7/93, 8/93, 10/93, 11/93, 13/93
8	0434782608 6956521739 13	1/23 x 8 = 8/23	2/23
9	076923	1/13 x 9 = 9/13	1/91, 2/91, 3/91, 4/91, 5/91, 6/91, 8/91, 9/91, 10/91
10	No solution	-	-
11	0112359550 5617977528 0898876404 4943820224 7191	1/89 x 11 = 11/89	2/89, 3/89, 4/89, 5/89, 6/89, 7/89, 8/89
12	No solution	-	-
13	0344827586 2068965517 24137931	1/29 x 13 = 13/29	2/29 1/87, 2/87, 4/87, 5/87, 6/87
14	0232558139 5348837209 3	1/43 x 14 = 14/43	2/43, 3/43
15	0588235294 117647	1/17 x 15 = 15/17	-

== Other bases ==
In duodecimal system, the transposable integers are: (using inverted two and three for ten and eleven, respectively)

Multiplier n	Smallest solution such that the multiplication moves the last digit to left	Digits	Represented by	Smallest solution such that the multiplication moves the first digit to right	Digits	Represented by
2	06316948421	↋	1/1↋ x 2 = 2/1↋	2497	4	1/5 x 2 = 2/5
3	2497	4	1/5 x 3 = 3/5	no solution		
4	0309236↊8820 61647195441	1↋	1/3↋ x 4 = 4/3↋	no solution		
5	025355↊94330 73↊458409919 ↋7151	25	1/4↋ x 5 = 5/4↋	186↊35	6	1/7 x 5 = 5/7
6	020408142854 ↊997732650↊1 83469163061	2↋	1/5↋ x 6 = 6/5↋	no solution		
7	01899↋864406 ↋33↊↊1542391 374594930525 5↋171	35	1/6↋ x 7 = 7/6↋	no solution		
8	076↋45	6	1/17 x 8 = 8/17	no solution		
9	014196486344 59↋9384↋26↋5 33040547216↊ 1155↋3↋12978 ↊3991	45	1/8↋ x 9 = 9/8↋	no solution		
↊	08579214↋364 29↊7	14	1/15 x ↊ = ↊/15	no solution		
↋	011235930336 ↊53909↊873↋3 25819↋997505 5↋54↊3145↊42 694157078404 491↋1	55	1/↊↋ x ↋ = ↋/↊↋	no solution		

Note that the “Shifting left cyclically by single position” problem has no solution for the multiplier less than 12 except 2 and 5, the same problem in decimal system has no solution for the multiplier less than 10 except 3.
