= Chua K'a =

Chua K'a is a three-part bodywork approach developed by Oscar Ichazo. It is based on the observation that tension in the body corresponds to specific fears; therefore, removing the tension via bodywork can remove the psychological trauma, a concept similar to other Mind–body interventions.

== History ==
Chua K'a Bodywork was first introduced by Oscar Ichazo to a group of Chilean students and then to a group of Americans in Arica, Chile in the 1960s. In teaching the method, Ichazo referred to an old legend about Mongolian warriors, who were said to have a way of removing pain and tension from their bodies that enabled them to return to battle without fear. The same perspective would apply to Chua K'a in that the pain of tension and the accompanying psychic fear would be eliminated, allowing the individual to be able to approach and live life without the limitations of these physical and mental distractions. There is no documentation or reference to Chua K'a that predates Ichazo.

== Purpose ==
The purpose of Chua K'a Bodywork® is to remove physical and psychic tension held in the body, through the focused application of physical pressure and 'conscious awareness.' Chua K'a is primarily practiced as a form of self-bodywork.

== Technique ==
The technique was developed by Oscar Ichazo and is taught in the Chua K'a Bodywork training by certified instructors through the Arica Institute. According to the Arica School website: "Chua K'a—deep bodywork done on oneself—enables the body to evolve to its highest degree of sensitivity and awareness. The impact of life experience creates networks of muscular tension (pain) that are remembered fears. Working the tissues with precise hand and finger positions and a stick called a k'a, we learn to transmit energy and heat to the bone, removing the tension. When we release physical tension, we release psychic tension as well."

Chua K'a Bodywork divides the body into 27 regions called zones of karma, each of which is associated with a particular fear or other psychic manifestation, whose memory is stored in these zones. For example, the fear of death may manifest as "feeling weak in the knees"; our cheeks may go red with shame; our jaw may be clenched in revulsion; or we may feel that we are carrying the weight of the world on our shoulders.

== Procedure ==
The complete Chua K'a Bodywork procedure consists of a comprehensive self-bodywork of the 27 zones of the body, followed by a rolling of the skin (skin rolling), and ending with the application of the k'a stick. In the technique of skin rolling, developed by Ichazo, the skin and subcutaneous tissues are rolled over the deep structures, lifting the dermis and hypodermis off the deeper fascia. This technique is recognized to reduce pain, restore mobility, and to stimulate circulation and lymph drainage. The three-part Chua K'a Bodywork method integrates these physical aspects of bodywork with a systematic practice of 'conscious awareness' by directly applying the vital energy flow in the body, originating from the point in the lower belly recognized in Chinese medicine and martial arts as the tan t'ien (known in the Arica method as the Kath).

== See also ==
- The Art of Massage
