= Cycles and fixed points =

Related mathematical concepts

16-bit Gray code permutation G multiplied with the bit-reversal permutation B G has 2 fixed points, 1 2-cycle and 3 4-cycles B has 4 fixed points and 6 2-cycles GB has 2 fixed points and 2 7-cycles

P * (1,2,3,4)^{T} = (4,1,3,2)^{T} Permutation of four elements with 1 fixed point and 1 3-cycle

In mathematics, the cycles of a permutation π of a finite set S correspond bijectively to the orbits of the subgroup generated by π acting on S. These orbits are subsets of S that can be written as { c_{1}, ..., c_{n} }, such that

π(c_{i}) = c_{i + 1} for i = 1, ..., n − 1, and π(c_{n}) = c_{1}.

The corresponding cycle of π is written as ( c_{1} c_{2} ... c_{n} ); this expression is not unique since c_{1} can be chosen to be any element of the orbit.

The size n of the orbit is called the length of the corresponding cycle; when n = 1, the single element in the orbit is called a fixed point of the permutation.

A permutation is determined by giving an expression for each of its cycles, and one notation for permutations consist of writing such expressions one after another in some order. For example, let

$$\pi
= \begin{pmatrix} 1 & 6 & 7 & 2 & 5 & 4 & 8 & 3 \\ 2 & 8 & 7 & 4 & 5 & 3 & 6 & 1 \end{pmatrix}
= \begin{pmatrix} 1 & 2 & 3 & 4 & 5 & 6 & 7 & 8 \\ 2 & 4 & 1 & 3 & 5 & 8 & 7 & 6 \end{pmatrix}$$

be a permutation that maps 1 to 2, 6 to 8, etc. Then one may write

π = ( 1 2 4 3 ) ( 5 ) ( 6 8 ) (7) = (7) ( 1 2 4 3 ) ( 6 8 ) ( 5 ) = ( 4 3 1 2 ) ( 8 6 ) ( 5 ) (7) = ...

Here 5 and 7 are fixed points of π, since π(5) = 5 and π(7)=7. It is typical, but not necessary, to not write the cycles of length one in such an expression. Thus, π = (1 2 4 3)(6 8), would be an appropriate way to express this permutation.

There are different ways to write a permutation as a list of its cycles, but the number of cycles and their contents are given by the partition of S into orbits, and these are therefore the same for all such expressions.

== Counting permutations by number of cycles ==
The unsigned Stirling number of the first kind, s(k, j) counts the number of permutations of k elements with exactly j disjoint cycles.

=== Properties ===
(1) For every k > 0 : s(k, k) = 1.

(2) For every k > 0 : s(k, 1) = (k − 1)!.

(3) For every k > j > 1, s(k, j) = s(k − 1,j − 1) + s(k − 1, j)·(k − 1)

=== Reasons for properties ===
(1) There is only one way to construct a permutation of k elements with k cycles: Every cycle must have length 1 so every element must be a fixed point.

(2.a) Every cycle of length k may be written as permutation of the number 1 to k; there are k! of these permutations.

(2.b) There are k different ways to write a given cycle of length k, e.g. ( 1 2 4 3 ) = ( 2 4 3 1 ) = ( 4 3 1 2 ) = ( 3 1 2 4 ).

(2.c) Finally: s(k, 1) = k!/k = (k − 1)!.

(3) There are two different ways to construct a permutation of k elements with j cycles:

(3.a) If we want element k to be a fixed point we may choose one of the s(k − 1, j − 1) permutations with k − 1 elements and j − 1 cycles and add element k as a new cycle of length 1.

(3.b) If we want element k not to be a fixed point we may choose one of the s(k − 1, j ) permutations with k − 1 elements and j cycles and insert element k in an existing cycle in front of one of the k − 1 elements.

=== Some values ===
| k | j | | | | | | | | | |
| k | 1 | 2 | 3 | 4 | 5 | 6 | 7 | 8 | 9 | sum |
|---|---|---|---|---|---|---|---|---|---|---|
| 1 | 1 | | | | | | | | | 1 |
| 2 | 1 | 1 | | | | | | | | 2 |
| 3 | 2 | 3 | 1 | | | | | | | 6 |
| 4 | 6 | 11 | 6 | 1 | | | | | | 24 |
| 5 | 24 | 50 | 35 | 10 | 1 | | | | | 120 |
| 6 | 120 | 274 | 225 | 85 | 15 | 1 | | | | 720 |
| 7 | 720 | 1,764 | 1,624 | 735 | 175 | 21 | 1 | | | 5,040 |
| 8 | 5,040 | 13,068 | 13,132 | 6,769 | 1,960 | 322 | 28 | 1 | | 40,320 |
| 9 | 40,320 | 109,584 | 118,124 | 67,284 | 22,449 | 4,536 | 546 | 36 | 1 | 362,880 |
| | 1 | 2 | 3 | 4 | 5 | 6 | 7 | 8 | 9 | sum |

== Counting permutations by number of fixed points ==
The value f(k, j) counts the number of permutations of k elements with exactly j fixed points. For the main article on this topic, see rencontres numbers.

=== Properties ===
(1) For every j < 0 or j > k : f(k, j) = 0.

(2) f(0, 0) = 1.

(3) For every k > 1 and k ≥ j ≥ 0, f(k, j) = f(k − 1, j − 1) + f(k − 1, j)·(k − 1 − j) + f(k − 1, j + 1)·(j + 1)

=== Reasons for properties ===
(3) There are three different methods to construct a permutation of k elements with j fixed points:

(3.a) We may choose one of the f(k − 1, j − 1) permutations with k − 1 elements and j − 1 fixed points and add element k as a new fixed point.

(3.b) We may choose one of the f(k − 1, j) permutations with k − 1 elements and j fixed points and insert element k in an existing cycle of length > 1 in front of one of the (k − 1) − j elements.

(3.c) We may choose one of the f(k − 1, j + 1) permutations with k − 1 elements and j + 1 fixed points and join element k with one of the j + 1 fixed points to a cycle of length 2.

=== Some values ===
| k | j | | | | | | | | | | |
| k | 0 | 1 | 2 | 3 | 4 | 5 | 6 | 7 | 8 | 9 | sum |
|---|---|---|---|---|---|---|---|---|---|---|---|
| 1 | 0 | 1 | | | | | | | | | 1 |
| 2 | 1 | 0 | 1 | | | | | | | | 2 |
| 3 | 2 | 3 | 0 | 1 | | | | | | | 6 |
| 4 | 9 | 8 | 6 | 0 | 1 | | | | | | 24 |
| 5 | 44 | 45 | 20 | 10 | 0 | 1 | | | | | 120 |
| 6 | 265 | 264 | 135 | 40 | 15 | 0 | 1 | | | | 720 |
| 7 | 1,854 | 1,855 | 924 | 315 | 70 | 21 | 0 | 1 | | | 5,040 |
| 8 | 14,833 | 14,832 | 7,420 | 2,464 | 630 | 112 | 28 | 0 | 1 | | 40,320 |
| 9 | 133,496 | 133,497 | 66,744 | 22,260 | 5,544 | 1,134 | 168 | 36 | 0 | 1 | 362,880 |
| | 0 | 1 | 2 | 3 | 4 | 5 | 6 | 7 | 8 | 9 | sum |

=== Alternate calculations ===
| Equations | Examples |
|---|---|
| $f(k,1)=\sum_{i=1}^k(-1)^{i+1}{k \choose i}i(k-i)!$ | $$\begin{align} f(5, 1) &= 5\times 1 \times4! - 10\times 2\times 3! + 10\times 3\times 2! - 5\times 4\times 1! + 1\times 5\times 0! \\ &= 120 - 120 + 60 - 20 + 5 = 45. \end{align}$$ |
| $f(k,0)=k!-\sum_{i=1}^k(-1)^{i+1}{k \choose i}(k-i)!$ | $$\begin{align} f(5, 0) &= 120 - ( 5\times4! - 10\times3! + 10\times2! - 5\times1! + 1\times0! ) \\ &= 120 - ( 120 - 60 + 20 - 5 + 1 ) = 120 - 76 = 44. \end{align}$$ |
| For every k > 1: $$f(k,0)=(k-1)(f(k-1,0)+f(k-2,0))$$ | $f(5, 0) = 4 \times ( 9 + 2 ) = 4 \times 11 = 44$ |
| For every k > 1: $$f(k,0)=k!\sum_{i=2}^k \frac{(-1)^i}{i!}$$ | $$\begin{align} f(5, 0) &= 120 \times ( 1/2 - 1/6 + 1/24 - 1/120 ) \\ &= 120 \times ( 60/120 - 20/120 + 5/120 - 1/120 ) = 120 \times 44/120 = 44 \end{align}$$ |
| $f(k,0)\approx \frac{k!}e$ where e is Euler's number ≈ 2.71828 | |

== See also ==
- Cyclic permutation
- Cycle notation
