= Elizabeth Wagele =

American cartoonist

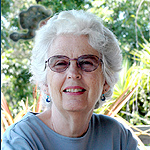
- Born: May 31, 1939; Salt Lake City, Utah, U.S.
- Died: March 27, 2017 (aged 77); Berkeley, California, U.S.
- Occupations: writer, musician, cartoonist
- Writing career
- Genres: psychology, self-help, children's literature, articles

Elizabeth Wagele (May 31, 1939 – March 27, 2017) was an American artist, musician, and writer of books on the Enneagram of Personality and the Myers-Briggs Type Indicator (MBTI).

== Life ==
Wagele was raised in Salt Lake City, Utah, until she was 10 when her family moved to Berkeley, California. She spent much of her time drawing, playing the piano, or making up stories with her dolls as a child. Music played a major role in her life as a friend and spiritual guide, especially Bach, Beethoven, Brahms, Bartók, Charles Mingus, Billie Holiday, and other classical and jazz composers. A gifted pianist who majored in music composition, she studied piano with Bernhard Abramowitsch and composition with Andrew Imbrie and graduated cum laude from the University of California, Berkeley, in 1961. Wagele partially supported herself in college by playing in a jazz combo. While raising her four children, Wagele studied, taught, and performed piano. She began writing books in 1993 at the age of 55, with her friend, Renee Baron.

Wagele died on March 27, 2017, in Berkeley, California. She is survived by her husband, four children and seven grandchildren.

== Works ==
=== Books ===
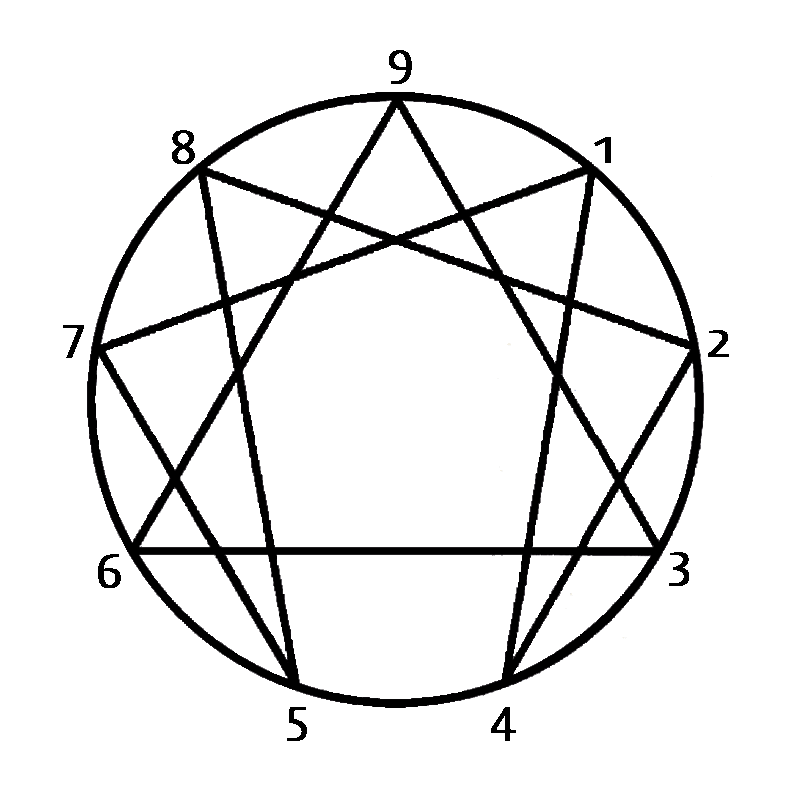
Enneagram symbol

Wagele wrote about the Enneagram of Personality and the Myers-Briggs system, especially introversion. An award-winning cartoonist, she illustrated her books with cartoons and was known for the humor in her writing.

In 1994, Baron and Wagele published a book on Enneagram personality typology geared toward the general reading public: The Enneagram Made Easy, which has been translated into 17 languages. The book was on the San Francisco Chronicle’s best sellers list for Quality Paperbacks in the Bay Area in 1994.

Are You My Type, Am I Yours? was published in 1995. In this book Baron and Wagele explored how the nine Enneagram Personality types interact in interpersonal relationships.

In 1997, Wagele wrote The Enneagram of Parenting, the first book to suggest that teachers and parents use the Enneagram to broaden their acceptance and understanding of children.

The Happy Introvert – A Wild and Crazy Guide for Celebrating Your True Self was published in 2006. Wagele included a section on the movie Napoleon Dynamite, along with chapters on relationships, children, Jung, neurology, personality, and creativity. Kathleen Grant Geib reviewed it as, "A delightful and informative guide for folks who call themselves introverts. Wagele sheds lights on differences between extroverts and introverts (25 to 30 percent of the U.S. population) and introduces main points of the fascinating personality survey, the Myers-Briggs Type Indicator. Fun illustrations add humor."

Finding the Birthday Cake – Helping Children Raise Their Self-Esteem, a book for children was published in 2007. It seeks to help children build high self-esteem.

The Career Within You, in 2009, was co-authored with Ingrid Stabb. It has been called "the perfect career book". David Daniels, Clinical Professor, Department of Psychiatry and Behavioral Science Stanford Medical School, and author of The Essential Enneagram called The Career Within You "a groundbreaking work." He described how the book provides for nine personas "thoughtful and clear descriptions, how each style relates to the spectrum of career choices and a powerful method to determine the path that best fits you. You will discover what career best fits your style and in the process a more fulfilling life."

The Enneagram of Death – helpful insights by the 9 types of people on grief, fear, and dying was published on July 13, 2012, by the International Enneagram Association. Mario Sikora, president of the International Enneagram Association said, "This first book being published by the IEA is by the popular and prolific Liz Wagele - [We] are glad to be supporting it and thankful that Liz has entrusted us to bring forth this important contribution to the field."

The Enneagram for Teens - Discover Your Personality Type and Celebrate Your True Self was published in September 2014 by PLI Media.

=== CDs ===
On Wagele’s The Beethoven Enneagram CD (1999) she discussed Beethoven’s personality and life and plays from his piano sonatas to demonstrate her belief that the nine Enneagram types can be heard in his music.

On her Enneagram Variations CD (2006) she improvised variations on "Jack and Jill" and "Chop Sticks", playing them in ways that she believed expresses each of the nine Enneagram styles. Both of these CDs were performed at International Enneagram Association conferences.
