= Enneagram of Personality =

Model of the human psyche used as a personality typology

Enneagram figure

The Enneagram of Personality, or simply the Enneagram, is a pseudoscientific model of the human psyche primarily understood and taught as a typology of nine interconnected personality types.

The historical origins of the ideas underlying the Enneagram of Personality remain a subject of debate. Contemporary approaches heavily derive from the teachings of Bolivian psycho-spiritual teacher Oscar Ichazo in the 1950s and Chilean psychiatrist Claudio Naranjo in the 1970s. Naranjo's theories were also shaped by earlier personality teachings developed by George Gurdjieff and the Fourth Way tradition during the first half of the 20th century.

As a typology, the Enneagram outlines nine distinct personality types (sometimes also referred to as "enneatypes"). These types are mapped onto the points of a geometric figure known as an enneagram, which illustrates the principal connections between them. Various schools of thought exist among Enneagram educators, leading to many different interpretations of the system.

The Enneagram of Personality is widely marketed in both business management and spirituality contexts across various media, including seminars, conferences, books, magazines, and DVDs. In the corporate world, it is often used as a tool for gaining insight into workplace interpersonal dynamics. In spiritual settings, it is commonly presented as a pathway to higher states of enlightenment and essence. Proponents across both fields assert that the Enneagram facilitates self-awareness, self-understanding, and overall self-development.

Formal psychometric analysis of the Enneagram has been limited, and the existing peer-reviewed research is generally not accepted by the relevant academic communities. Although the Enneagram incorporates certain concepts that parallel established theories of personality, experts in personality assessment widely dismiss the system as pseudoscience.

== History ==
The origins and historical development of the Enneagram of Personality remain a subject of debate. Concepts similar to the Enneagram can be traced back to the writings of Evagrius Ponticus, a Christian mystic who lived in 4th-century Alexandria, Egypt. Evagrius identified eight logismoi (“deadly thoughts”) alongside a foundational concept he termed “love of self.” He wrote, “The first thought of all is that of love of self [philautia]; after this, [come] the eight.” In addition to these eight deadly thoughts, Evagrius outlined corresponding “virtues” that stand in opposition to them.

G. I. Gurdjieff (d. 1949) is credited as the first to use the term enneagram and remains the sole known source for its geometric figure. However, he did not develop the nine personality types associated with the modern Enneagram of Personality. Instead, Gurdjieff utilized the symbol for various other purposes, including the sacred dances known as the Gurdjieff movements.

Oscar Ichazo (1931–2020) is recognized as the principal source of the contemporary Enneagram of Personality, which heavily derives from his teachings on ego-fixations, holy ideas, passions, and virtues. The Bolivian-born Ichazo began leading self-development programs in the 1950s. His methodology, termed "Protoanalysis," incorporated the enneagram figure alongside several other symbols and concepts. Ichazo founded the Arica Institute—which was originally based in Chile before relocating to the United States in the 1970s—and coined the term “Enneagram of Personality” (initially referring to it as the “Enneagon of Personality”).

Claudio Naranjo (1932–2019) studied the Enneagram of Personality under Ichazo in 1970 before developing and teaching his own interpretation of the system in the United States, primarily at the Esalen Institute and to students in Berkeley, California. Two of Naranjo's students, who were Jesuit priests, subsequently adapted the Enneagram for Christian spirituality programs at Loyola University in Chicago. Ichazo fiercely objected to the teachings of Naranjo and others, viewing their adaptations as misinterpretations and misuses of the original Enneagram.

Naranjo's teachings gained widespread popularity in the United States and abroad beginning in the 1970s. During the 1980s and 1990s, numerous authors published books on the Enneagram of Personality, notably Don Richard Riso (1987), Helen Palmer (1988), Eli Jaxon-Bear (1989), Elizabeth Wagele (1994), and Richard Rohr (1995). In 1994, the First International Enneagram Conference was held at Stanford University with approximately 1,400 attendees. It was co-sponsored by the university's psychiatry department, where psychiatrist, Enneagram author, and conference co-director David Daniels was a faculty member.

An analysis of Google search trends over a 16-year period reveals a significant spike in searches for the word “enneagram” starting in 2017. Furthermore, the proliferation of Enneagram-focused social media accounts and podcasts indicates a surge in popularity among millennials. Observers have suggested that this modern revival of the Enneagram parallels a renewed interest in astrology.

== Figure ==
The enneagram figure consists of three primary components: a circle, an inner triangle connecting points 3, 6, and 9, and an irregular hexagonal “periodic figure” following the specific sequence 1-4-2-8-5-7. According to esoteric spiritual traditions, the circle symbolizes unity, the inner triangle symbolizes the “law of three,” and the irregular hexagram represents the “law of seven.” This connection to the number seven stems from the repeating decimal 1-4-2-8-5-7-1, which is generated by dividing one by seven in base-10 arithmetic. Together, these three elements form the standard enneagram figure.

== Nine types ==
The table below offers an outline of the principal characteristics of the nine types along with their basic relationships. This table expands upon Oscar Ichazo's ego fixations, holy ideas, passions, and virtues primarily using material from Understanding the Enneagram: The Practical Guide to Personality Types (revised edition) by Don Richard Riso and Russ Hudson as well as Charles Tart's Transpersonal Psychologies. Other theorists may disagree on some aspects. The types are normally referred to by their numbers, but sometimes their "characteristic roles" (which refers to distinctive archetypal characteristics) are used instead. Various labels for each type are commonly used by different authors and teachers. The "stress" and "security" points (sometimes referred to as the "disintegration" and "integration" points) are the types connected by the lines of the enneagram figure and are believed to influence a person in an adverse or relaxed circumstance. According to this hypothesis, someone with a primary One type, for example, may begin to think, feel, and act more like someone with a Four type when stressed or a Seven type when relaxed.

Type	Characteristic role	Ego fixation	Holy idea	Trap	Basic fear	Basic desire	Temptation	Vice / Passion	Virtue	Stress/ Disintegration	Security/ Integration
1	Reformer, Perfectionist	Resentment	Perfection	Perfection	Corruptness, imbalance, being bad	Goodness, integrity, balance	Hypocrisy, hypercriticism	Anger	Serenity	4	7
2	Helper, Giver	Flattery	Freedom, Will	Freedom	Being unlovable	To feel worthy of love	Deny own needs, manipulation	Pride	Humility	8	4
3	Achiever, Performer	Vanity	Hope, Law	Efficiency	Worthlessness	To feel valuable	Pushing self to always be "the best"	Deceit	Truthfulness	9	6
4	Individualist, Romantic	Melancholy	Origin	Authenticity	Having no identity or significance	To be uniquely themselves	To overuse imagination in search of self	Envy	Equanimity (Emotional Balance)	2	1
5	Investigator, Observer	Stinginess	Omniscience, Transparency	Observer	Helplessness, incapability, incompetence	Mastery, understanding	Replacing direct experience with concepts	Avarice	Detachment	7	8
6	Loyalist, Loyal Skeptic	Cowardice	Faith	Security	Being without support or guidance	To have support and guidance	Indecision, doubt, seeking reassurance	Fear	Courage	3	9
7	Enthusiast, Epicure	Planning	Plan, Work, Wisdom	Idealism	Being unfulfilled, trapped, deprived	To be satisfied and content	Thinking fulfillment is somewhere else	Gluttony	Sobriety	1	5
8	Challenger, Protector	Vengeance	Truth	Justice	Being controlled, harmed, violated	To gain influence and be self-sufficient	Thinking they are completely self-sufficient	Lust	Innocence	5	2
9	Peacemaker, Mediator	Indolence	Love	Seeker	Loss, fragmentation, separation	Wholeness, peace of mind	Avoiding conflicts, avoiding self-assertion	Sloth	Action	6	3

=== Three triads of type patterns ===
The nine Enneagram personality type patterns are grouped into various triads of three types in which each of the types have multiple common personality issues. The most well-known of these triad groupings is also associated with the three "centers of intelligence" as taught by G. I. Gurdjieff. These three centers are traditionally known as the intellectual, emotional, and instinctual centers. Although each person is understood to always have all three centers active in their personality structure, certain personality issues are more associated with one of the centers depending on a person's dominant type pattern. In Enneagram of Personality teachings each of these centers has a more particular or stronger association with one of the triads of personality types as follows:

- The intellectual center is particularly associated with types 5, 6, and 7. People with one of these dominant type patterns are largely motivated by "thinking" issues related to fear.
- The emotional center is particularly associated with types 2, 3, and 4. People with one of these dominant type patterns are largely motivated by "feeling" and "image" issues related to shame.
- The instinctual center is particularly associated with types 8, 9, and 1. People with one of these dominant type patterns are largely motivated by "gut" issues related to anger.

An individual's tritype is a three digit number where each digit corresponds to individual's dominant type in each of the three centers of intelligence.

=== Wings ===
Most, but not all, Enneagram of Personality enthusiasts teach that a person's basic type is modified, at least to some extent, by the personality dynamics of the two adjacent types as indicated on the enneagram figure. These two types are called "wings". A person with the Three personality type, for example, is understood to have points Two and Four as their wing types. The circle of the enneagram figure may indicate that the types or points exist on a spectrum rather than as distinct types or points unrelated to those adjacent to them. A person may be understood, therefore, to have a core type and one or two wing types which influence but do not change the core type. Empirical research into the wing concept by Anthony Edwards did not support the hypothesis. Related to, but not the same, as the wing concept is Ichazo's viewpoint involving the active, attractive, and function forces. According to him, the type is made from a starting point, referred to as the active force. In turn, the type is also led with an attractive force. This ends with the "function", where the result is the formation of a type in between the two. Naranjo said about the wings that a person "can easily see" their primary type as being between its adjacent wings.

=== Connecting lines ===
For some Enneagram theorists the lines connecting the points add further meaning to the information provided by the descriptions of the types. Sometimes called the "security" and "stress" points, or points of "integration" and "disintegration", some theorists believe these connected points also contribute to a person's overall personality. From this viewpoint, therefore, at least four other points affect a person's overall personality; the two points connected by the lines to the core type and the two wing points. The earlier teachings about the connecting lines are now rejected or modified by Enneagram teachers, including Claudio Naranjo who developed them.

=== Instinctual subtypes ===
Each of the personality types is understood as having three "instinctual subtypes". These subtypes are believed to be formed according to which one of three instinctual energies of a person is dominantly developed and expressed. The instinctual energies are called "self-preservation", "sexual" (also called "intimacy" or "one-to-one"), and "social". On the instinctual level, people may internally stress and externally express the need to protect themselves (self-preservation), to connect with important others or partners (sexual), or to get along or succeed in groups (social). From this perspective, there are 27 distinct personality patterns, because people of each of the nine types also express themselves as one of the three subtypes. An alternative approach to the subtypes understands them as three domains or clusters of instincts which result in increased probability of survival (the "preserving" domain), increased skill in navigating the social environment (the "navigating" domain), and increased likelihood of reproductive success (the "transmitting" domain). From this understanding the subtypes reflect individual differences in the presence of these three separate clusters of instincts.

It is believed that people function in all three forms of instinctual energies, but one instinct will be more well-developed and dominant.

== Type indicator tests ==
Enneagram type indicator tests have been developed by prominent teachers, such as Don Richard Riso and Russ Hudson who developed the Riso–Hudson Enneagram Type Indicator (RHETI) in 1993. Their research focused on constructing it as a personality measurement instrument. The RHETI has heuristic value but minimal scientific research conducted.

The Stanford Enneagram Discovery Inventory was developed by psychiatry professor David Daniels at Stanford University and was later renamed the Essential Enneagram Test. This assessment was employed to conduct various research studies, including on the personalities of identical twins.

A 2002 review of validation studies of various Enneagram tests found guarded support for their reliability and validity.

== Research and criticism ==
While Enneagram teachings have attained a degree of popularity, they have been categorized by many professionals as a pseudoscience due to their subjectivity and inability to be tested scientifically, and described as "an assessment method of no demonstrated reliability or validity". In 2011, the scientific skeptic Robert Todd Carroll included the Enneagram in a list of pseudoscientific theories that "can't be tested because they are so vague and malleable that anything relevant can be shoehorned to fit the theory".

A 2020 review of Enneagram empirical work found mixed results for the model's reliability and validity. The study noted that the ipsative version of the Riso-Hudson Enneagram Type Indicator (scores on one dimension decrease scores on another dimension) had troubles with validity, whereas the non-ipsative version of the test has been found to have better internal consistency and test-retest reliability. It was found that 87% of individuals were able to accurately predict their Enneagram type (before taking the test) by being read descriptions of each type.

In a Delphi poll of 101 doctoral-level members of psychological organizations such as the American Psychological Association, the Enneagram was among five psychological treatments and tests which were rated by at least 25% of them as being discredited for personality assessment. Experts familiar with the Enneagram rated it with a mean score of 4.14 (3.37 in the first round of the study) which is approximately an equivalent to the option "probably discredited" (3 = possibly discredited, 4 = probably discredited, 5 = certainly discredited).

The Enneagram has also received criticism from religious perspectives. In 2000, the United States Conference of Catholic Bishops' Committee on Doctrine produced a draft report on the origins of the Enneagram to aid bishops in their evaluation of its use in their dioceses. The report identified aspects of the intersection between the Enneagram and Roman Catholicism which, in their opinion, warranted scrutiny with potential areas of concern, stating, "While the enneagram system shares little with traditional Christian doctrine or spirituality, it also shares little with the methods and criteria of modern science ... The burden of proof is on proponents of the enneagram to furnish scientific evidence for their claims." Partly in response to Jesuits and members of other religious orders teaching a Christian understanding of the Enneagram of Personality, a 2003 Vatican document called Jesus Christ, the Bearer of the Water of Life. A Christian Reflection on the 'New Age' said that the Enneagram "when used as a means of spiritual growth introduces an ambiguity in the doctrine and the life of the Christian faith".

== See also ==
- 16PF Questionnaire – Self-report personality test
- A. H. Almaas – American writer and spiritual teacher (born 1944)
- Big Five personality traits – Personality model consisting of five broad dimensions
- Myers–Briggs Type Indicator – Pseudoscientific personality questionnaire
- Personality psychology – Branch of psychology focused on personality
- Revised NEO Personality Inventory – Big Five personality trait inventory
