= Oscar Ichazo =

Bolivian philosopher (1931–2020)

- Ichazo in 2004
- Born: July 24, 1931; Bolivia
- Died: March 26, 2020 (aged 88); Kihei, Hawaii, US

Philosophical work
- Era: Modern philosophy
- School: Arica School
- Notable students: John C. Lilly; Claudio Naranjo

Oscar Ichazo (July 24, 1931 – March 26, 2020) was a Bolivian philosopher and an advocate of integral theory. Following his early life in Bolivia, Ichazo was later principally based in Chile, where he founded the Arica School in 1968. He lived his last decades in Hawaii, where he died. Ichazo's Arica School can be considered, as Ramparts magazine described it in 1973, "A body of techniques for cosmic consciousness-raising and an ideology to relate to the world in an awakened way." An American headquarters, the Arica Institute, was established in New York in 1971.

The Arica School's origins began in 1956 when groups of people formed in major cities in South America to study the theory and method that Ichazo was proposing. For fourteen years these different groups studied his teachings. In 1968, Ichazo presented lectures on his theories of Protoanalysis and the ego-fixations at the Institute of Applied Psychology in Santiago, Chile.

Ichazo's theories are based upon traditional metaphysical questions such as: "What is humankind?"; "What is the supreme good of humanity?"; and "What is the truth that gives meaning and value to human life?"

== Teachings ==
=== Protoanalysis ===
Ichazo developed the philosophical and psychological tools used in the Arica School studies, which are based on his "Protoanalytical Theory, System and Method", more commonly called "Protoanalysis". Before 1980, the term "Protoanalysis" was misunderstood to be narrower in scope, used specifically as the name for Ichazo's theory of ego-fixations from which the Enneagram of Personality was developed.

In Protoanalysis, Ichazo described nine ways in which a person's ego becomes fixated within the psyche at an early stage of life. For each person, one of these "ego fixations" then becomes the core of a self-image around which their psychological personality develops. Each fixation is also supported at the emotional level by a particular passion. Ichazo described these passions as emotional energy in disarray, much like a sickness. The principal psychological connections between the nine ego fixations can be mapped using the points, lines, and circle of the enneagram figure.

Ichazo's teachings are designed to help people transcend their identification with — and the suffering caused by — their own mechanistic thought and behavior patterns. His theories about the fixations are founded on the premise that all life seeks to continue and perpetuate itself and that the human psyche must follow universal laws of reality. The study of the fixations does not produce a typology. Rather, it analyzes the characteristics of the human ego based on the three instincts known as conservation, relation, and adaptation, and the two poles of our psychic life: our sexuality or sense of life continuation, and our spirituality, or sense of internal unity.

Ichazo understood the fixations as instinctual points that have been hurt. The primary difference between modern psychology and his theories is that he proposed a model of the psyche where the instincts, when affected, injured or handicapped, can be liberated to accomplish Unity, whereas modern psychology has preferred to focus on observed behavior.

According to Ichazo, a person's fixation derives from childhood subjective experience (self-perception) of psychological trauma when expectations are not met in each of the instincts. Young children are self-centered and thus experience disappointment in their expectations because of one of three fundamental attitudes: attracted, unattracted, disinterested. From such experiences, mechanistic thought and behavior patterns arise as an attempted defense against the recurrence of the trauma. By understanding the fixations — and practicing self-observation — it is believed that a person can reduce or even transcend suffering and the fixations' hold on the mind.

=== Integral philosophy ===
According to Ichazo, integral philosophy is an ancient philosophical tradition that represents all things in the universe as interconnected. Ichazo's version presents an analysis of the human condition from the lowest levels of the human process to the highest states of enlightenment (theosis). This body of teaching includes the analysis that Ichazo termed Protoanalysis, and Ichazo's Enneagram of Personality. In his teachings the enneagram figure was initially called an enneagon.

In a 1954 interview, Ichazo said that he had achieved insight into mechanistic and repetitive thought and behavior patterns. These processes can be understood in connection with the enneagram figure, classical philosophy, and what he called "Trialectical Logic" which analyzes reality on the basis of cycles.

==== Basic theory ====
The entire theory is referred to as based on the idea of the innate structure of the mind. That is, the questions come from the instincts and the instincts are a result of a pre-existing structure that is the foundation of mind itself. It is a concept considered logical because there must be a pre-existing order if all minds share essential similarities.

Ichazo refined the ancient concept that a human soul has components by approaching the issue through three instinctual questions that he considered basic to human existence: "How am I?", "Who am I with?", "What am I doing?" Ichazo labeled these conservation, relations, and syntony (later modified to adaptation). Recognizing interactions among the three, he developed a 3 x 3 = 9 component system, which he correlated with several schemas that have long existed in diverse fields: spectrum of light, chakras, physiological systems, and the enneagram.

For self-observation of habitual patterns, Ichazo employed the enneagram, among other tools. Transformative practices sometimes involved linking a specific mudra and/or bija with each of the nine points of the enneagram. During the first three decades or so, most aspects of his theory that were mapped onto the enneagram were circular mappings (e.g., closing of the spectrum into a circular Rainbow Eye) that involved little or no utilization of the interconnecting lines that constitute the enneagram's form. In other words, most of the maps were enneagons rather than enneagrams (refer to enneagram figure for drawings that show the difference).

==== Enneagram of Personality ====
Ichazo is considered by many to be the father of the Enneagram of Personality (usually just called the Enneagram) movement which uses an enneagram figure. The United States Court of Appeals ruled that Ichazo is the original author of the application of the enneagram figure to a theory of ego fixations (which are the precursor to personality disorders). However, this ruling denied copyright injunction under the "fair use" doctrine of copyright law. Because the enneagram symbol is a discovery (not an invention), the legal issue was not use of the symbol but rather the copyrightability of specific "enneagrams", meaning the symbol plus descriptive words (or other information) associated with each point. Ichazo had earlier described the enneagrams as a set of immutable laws but he had also said that he "developed" the enneagrams.

Ichazo applied the enneagram figure in connection with his theory of mechanical ego mechanisms which grow out of psychological traumas suffered at an early age in specific aspects of the human psyche. In his basic theory, these aspects of the human psyche include the sense of well-being (conservation instinct); the sense of relations with others (relation instinct); and the sense of adapting to our environment (adaptation instinct). Ichazo's goal with regard to the study of the enneagram was to facilitate the recognition of repetitive, mechanistic thinking and behavior in a person's psychological process and to eliminate the suffering rooted in the attachment to, and identification with, these mechanisms (which, Ichazo taught, attempt to protect people from suffering but actually tend to perpetuate it).

The popular use of the Enneagram of Personality (as contrasted with the use of enneagrams within the Arica School) began principally with Claudio Naranjo who had studied with Ichazo in Chile. Naranjo had added defense mechanisms to the model developed by Ichazo: "His contribution to the Enneagram successfully joined the insight and methods of a mystical path of transformation with the intellectual power of a Western psychological model." Nevertheless, Ichazo considered Naranjo's understanding of the Enneagram to be limited and incomplete.

In 1992, intellectual copyright for the Enneagram of Personality was denied to Ichazo on the basis that he had published statements that his theories were factual, and facts cannot be copyrighted. The litigation, however, confirmed Ichazo as the source of the Enneagram of Personality and fixations, its application, meaning, and related material.

==== Essence and ego ====
Like some other systems of self-actualization, Arica works with the (ultimately illusory) separation of essence and ego. An important aspect of this work is to observe a person's habits and reactions in accordance with a typology of nine. However, Ichazo referred to the characterizations as "fixations" rather than "personality types" and he repeatedly emphasized that every human being contains all nine fixations ("we have to awaken all the nine positions"). The fixations are considered as simply keys to self-discovery, not forms of identity such as a sun sign in astrology.

== Originality of Ichazo's teachings ==
Although some modern Enneagram of Personality writers have suggested that Ichazo's teachings are derived, in part, from those of Gurdjieff's Fourth Way teachings, Ichazo denied this in his "Letter to the Transpersonal Community". In July 1990, as part of a settlement with Dimension Books, each of the authors who were part of the lawsuit agreed in writing that "Oscar Ichazo is the sole originator of the theory of the ego fixations and the system of enneagons representing the different functions of the human Psyche."

Although the symbolism of the number 9 is ancient, there does not appear to be any evidence for the particular enneagram used by Ichazo, in Sufism or elsewhere, before its first known use by Gurdjieff in the 20th century.

== Arica School ==
The Arica School, or simply Arica, is a Human Potential Movement group founded by Ichazo in 1968. The school is named after the city of Arica, Chile, where Ichazo once lived and where he led an intensive months-long training in 1970 and 1971 before settling in the United States. The Arica Institute is the incorporated educational organization of the Arica School. It was incorporated in 1971 with its headquarters in New York.

The Arica School can be considered, as Ramparts magazine put it in 1973, "A body of techniques for cosmic consciousness-raising and an ideology to relate to the world in an awakened way."

== Bibliography ==
- Ichazo, Oscar (1976). The Human Process for Enlightenment and Freedom: A Series of Five Lectures. Arica Institute, Inc. ISBN 0-671-22432-8.
- Ichazo, Oscar (1980). The Cutting of the Adamantine Pyramid. Arica Institute, Inc.
- Ichazo, Oscar (1982a). Between Metaphysics and Protoanalysis: A Theory for Analyzing the Human Psyche. Arica Institute Press. ISBN 0-916554-04-X.
- Ichazo, Oscar (1982b). Bleibtreu, John (ed.). Interviews with Oscar Ichazo. Arica Press. ISBN 0-916554-02-3.
- Ichazo, Oscar (1986). Master Level Exercise: Psychocalisthenics. Arica Institute Press. ISBN 0-916554-25-2.
- Ichazo, Oscar (1988). Letters to the School (1st ed.). The Oscar Ichazo Foundation. ISBN 0-916554-17-1.
- Ichazo, Oscar (Autumn 1991). "Letter to the Transpersonal Community". The Arican: International Journal of Arica Institute (5): 106.
- Ichazo, Oscar (2015). Oscar Ichazo: Insights Into the Teacher, the Philosophy, the School. The Oscar Ichazo Foundation. ISBN 978-0-916554-00-2.
- Ichazo, Oscar (2016). The Religious Consciousness. The Oscar Ichazo Foundation. ISBN 978-0-916554-14-9.
- Ichazo, Oscar (2018). The Nine Constituents: The Science of the Human Condition from Ego to Enlightenment. Arica Institute Press. ISBN 978-0-916554-16-3.
- Ichazo, Oscar (2020a). The Four Killers of Humanity: The Ethical Solution to our Existential Crisis. The Oscar Ichazo Foundation. ISBN 978-0-916554-19-4.
- Ichazo, Oscar (2020b). The History of the Integral Teachings, Vol I. The Oscar Ichazo Foundation. ISBN 978-0-916554-20-0.
- Ichazo, Oscar (2025). The History of the Integral Teachings, Vol II. The Oscar Ichazo Foundation. ISBN 978-1-966138-28-0
- Ichazo, Oscar (2021). We Are One: Facing our Global Crisis with Unity. The Oscar Ichazo Foundation. ISBN 978-0-916554-28-6.
- Ichazo, Oscar (2015, 2024). Human Culture and Enlightenment. The Oscar Ichazo Foundation. ISBN 978-0916554965
- Ichazo, Oscar (2015, 2024). Oscar Ichazo: Insights into the Teacher • The Philosophy• The School. The Oscar Ichazo Foundation. ISBN 978-0916554699
- Ichazo, Oscar (2023, 2024). Parallels between Platonism and Mahayana Buddhism. The Oscar Ichazo Foundation. ISBN 978-0916554996
- Ichazo, Oscar (2024). The Enneagrams of the Divine Forms, Perfect, Eternal, Unchanging Truths. The Oscar Ichazo Foundation. ISBN 978-0916554989
- Ichazo, Oscar (2023, 2025). A Commentary on Crazy Wisdom. The Oscar Ichazo Foundation. ISBN 978-0916554941
- Ichazo, Oscar (2024). The Enneagrams of the Fixations, The Original Teachings. The Oscar Ichazo Foundation. ISBN 978-1966138068
- Ichazo, Oscar (2024). The Enneagrams of Ethics • Virtues • Senses — The Original Integral Teachings. The Oscar Ichazo Foundation. ISBN 978-1966138037
- Ichazo, Oscar (2024). The Enneagram in Five Lectures. The Oscar Ichazo Foundation. ISBN 978-1966138020
- Ichazo, Oscar (2024). Enneagram Knowledge, Teachings by Oscar Ichazo. The Oscar Ichazo Foundation. ISBN 978-0916554958
- Ichazo, Oscar (2024). The Climate Catastrophe — The Four Killers, Beyond Eco–Anxiety into Unity and Action. The Oscar Ichazo Foundation. ISBN 978-0916554835
- Ichazo, Oscar (2024). Tantra Truth. The Oscar Ichazo Foundation. ISBN 978-0916554866
- Ichazo, Oscar (2025). Oscar Ichazo • Integral Philosophy • The Arica School. The Oscar Ichazo Foundation. ISBN 978-1966138075
- Ichazo, Oscar (2025). Make Exercise A Meditation, Mastering Your Breath. The Oscar Ichazo Foundation. ISBN 978-0916554934
- Ichazo, Oscar (2025). P–Cals and Chi–Generating Exercises. The Oscar Ichazo Foundation. ISBN 978-1966138099
- Ichazo, Oscar (2025). Doorways into the Mysteries of the Universe. The Oscar Ichazo Foundation. ISBN 978-1966138174
- Ichazo, Oscar (2011). P–Cals / Psychocalisthenics: Exercises to Awaken Your Core Fire. The Oscar Ichazo Foundation. ASIN B007OCD0FE
- Ichazo, Oscar (2004). Kath State: The Energy of Inner Fire. Velocity Training. ASIN B007HFJ8UE
- Ichazo, Oscar (1977). Arica Psychocalisthenics. Simon & Schuster. ISBN 978-0671222376
- Ichazo, Oscar (2025). Breath of Core Fire, Awaken • Generate • Revitalize. The Oscar Ichazo Foundation. ISBN 978-1-966138-20-4
- Ichazo, Oscar (2025). Movements of The Kath State, The Energy of Inner Fire. The Oscar Ichazo Foundation.
- Ichazo, Oscar (2025). Insights into the Enneagrams of the Fixations. The Oscar Ichazo Foundation. ISBN 978-1-966138-19-8
- Ichazo, Oscar (2025). Awaken Energy, Discover Your Inner Fire. The Oscar Ichazo Foundation. ISBN 978-1-966138-48-8
- Ichazo, Oscar (2025). Death, Beyond the Mystery into Eternal Light. The Oscar Ichazo Foundation. ISBN 978-1-966138-43-3

== See also ==
- Chua K'a, a three-part bodywork approach developed by Ichazo
- The Holy Mountain, a 1973 film which Ichazo helped with by training the staff in various spiritual exercises
- John C. Lilly – American physician, scientist, psychonaut, and philosopher
