= Chelsea Quinn Yarbro =

American writer (1942–2025)

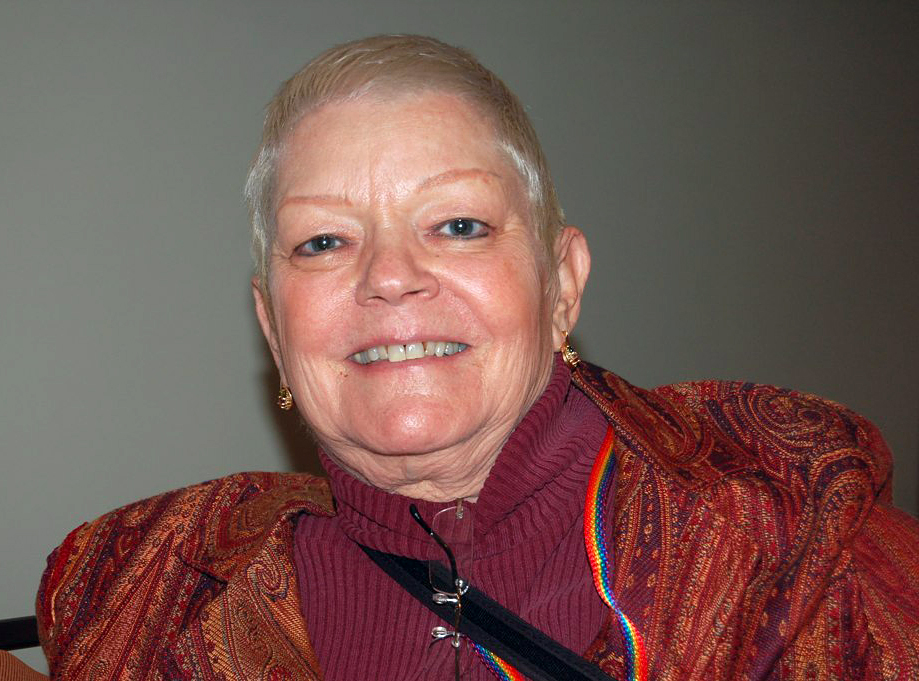
- Yarbro in 2009
- Born: Karen Erickson; September 15, 1942; Berkeley, California, U.S.
- Died: August 31, 2025 (aged 82); San Francisco Bay Area, California, U.S.
- Education: San Francisco State College
- Occupation: Author
- Spouse: Donald Simpson (m. 1969; div. 1982)
- Writing career
- Pen name: Quinn Fawcett, Trystam Kith, Terry Nelson Bonner, T. C. F. Hopkins, Camellia Gabor, Vanessa Pryor
- Language: English
- Genres: Science fiction, horror
- Notable work: The Saint-Germain Cycle
- Website: www.chelseaquinnyarbro.net

Chelsea Quinn Yarbro (September 15, 1942 – August 31, 2025) was an American writer. She was known for her series of historical horror novels about Count Saint-Germain.

== Early life and career ==
Yarbro was born in Berkeley, California, on September 15, 1942. She attended Berkeley schools through high school followed by three years at San Francisco State College (now University).

Writing for over 45 years, Yarbro worked in a wide variety of genres, from science fiction to westerns, from young adult adventure to historical horror. She was the author of over 70 novels and numerous short stories. In addition to the Count Saint-Germain novels, she also published numerous volumes in a popular series of channeled wisdom from the entity Michael in the Messages from Michael series.

Yarbro's contribution to the horror genre has been recognised in a variety of ways: she was named a Grand Master at the World Horror Convention in 2003, and in 2005 the International Horror Guild named her a "Living Legend". She has received the Knightly Order of the Brasov Citadel from the Transylvanian Society of Dracula. In 2009 the Horror Writers' Association presented Yarbro with the Bram Stoker Award for Lifetime Achievement. In 2014, she was honored with the World Fantasy Award for Life Achievement. Additionally, two of her novels, The Palace (1979) and Ariosto (1980) were nominated for the World Fantasy Award, neither winning.

In 2016, she reported that on average, she wrote three to four books and one or two short stories and/or essays a year. She wrote six hours per day, six days per week except when traveling. Five days a week she spent three to four hours doing research.

Aside from writing, she worked as a cartographer, read tarot card and palms, and composed music. Over the years she studied seven instruments, voice, and musical theory: composition, voice, and piano continued to be active interests for her. The newsletter, Yclept Yarbro, about her and her writings was published by Lindig Hall Harris until Harris's death; then a newsletter was issued irregularly via Yarbro's website. She played a major role in popularizing The Eye of Argon, a novella that became part of widespread science fiction convention reading game.

== Personal life and death ==
In November 1969, she married Donald Simpson and divorced in February 1982. She had no children.

Yarbro died on August 31, 2025.

== Pseudonyms ==
- Quinn Fawcett, for projects coauthored with Bill Fawcett
- Trystam Kith, for the two volume Trouble in the Forest historical fantasy series featuring vampire antagonists
- Terry Nelson Bonner, for the fifth volume of The Making of Australia series
- T. C. F. Hopkins, for historical nonfiction
- Camille Gabor, for the high fantasy series, The Vildecaz Talents
- Vanessa Pryor, for the romance novel Taste of Wine

== The Michael teachings ==
Messages from Michael is the first in a series of four books recounting three-decade-long "conversation" between a group of friends centered around Sarah Chambers (1937–1998) with a channeled entity and spiritual teacher that has come to be known as Michael. As of September 2013 this conversation continues, as the Michael group continues to conduct closed sessions in the San Francisco Bay Area. A core concept of the teachings is "all choices made are equally valid."

Yarbro's book presented a heavily fictionalized version of Sarah Chambers' group, which gave Chambers the alias of "Jessica Lansing". The three subsequent books contain more edited channeling transcripts, along with background material.
