= Quinn Fawcett =

American novelist

Quinn Fawcett is the pen name of a pair of authors, Chelsea Quinn Yarbro and Bill Fawcett, who also write separately. Among their collaborations are a series of mysteries featuring Victoire Vernet, fictional wife of one of Napoleon's generals; a series featuring Sherlock Holmes's brother Mycroft; and a series fictionalizing the espionage experiences of James Bond creator Ian Fleming.

== Bibliography ==
=== Mme. Vernet books ===
- Napoleon Must Die (1993, ISBN 0-380-76541-1)
- Death Wears a Crown (1993, ISBN 0-380-76542-X)

=== Mycroft Holmes books ===
- Against The Brotherhood (1997, ISBN 0-8125-4523-0)
- Embassy Row (1998, ISBN 0-8125-4522-2)
- The Flying Scotsman (1999, ISBN 0-312-86364-0)
- The Scottish Ploy (2000, ISBN 0-312-87628-9)

=== Ian Fleming books ===
- Death to Spies (2002, ISBN 978-0-312-86930-4)
- Siren Song (2003, ISBN 978-0-312-86928-1)
- Honor Among Spies (2004, ISBN 978-0-312-87644-9)
