= Don Richard Riso =

American writer (1946–2012)

Don Richard Riso (January 17, 1946 – August 30, 2012) was an American teacher of the Enneagram of Personality who wrote and co-wrote a number of books on the subject.

== Early life and education ==
Riso grew up in New Orleans, Louisiana. He studied English and philosophy and received a M.A. from Stanford University. Around 1962, he joined the Society of Jesus (Jesuits) of the New Orleans Province, but later left the order without being ordained.

== Enneagram work ==
In the early 1970s, some members of the Jesuit order came in contact with Enneagram of Personality materials as it was beginning to be taught in Jesuit and other Roman Catholic institutions in North America. In 1974, as a Jesuit seminarian in Toronto, Canada, Riso first learned of the Jesuit teachings on the Enneagram from Jesuit priest Tad Dunne. Riso said the Jesuit teachings on the Enneagram "consisted of nine one-page impressionistic sketches of the personality types" and fascinated him. In the following year, 1975, he left the order and began developing the brief type sketches into more detailed descriptions.

Riso developed a number of original ideas regarding understanding the Enneagram, such as nine "levels of development" from "liberated" or "healthy" to "pathologically unhealthy". Riso spent 10 years in the Harvard library almost daily from 10am to 5pm developing these ideas.

In 1987, Riso published his 12 years of Enneagram thinking in his first book, Personality Types: Using the Enneagram for Self-Discovery. This work showed the influence of Carl Gustav Jung and also of Karen Horney. Three years later he published Understanding the Enneagram.

In 1991, Russ Hudson joined Riso, originally to create a questionnaire for indicating people's Enneagram types. The result was the Riso–Hudson Enneagram Type Indicator (RHETI). Several versions have since been developed, the present complete version consisting of 144 pairs of forced-choice statements.

In 1995, Riso and Hudson founded the Enneagram Institute in New York City. The institute has since moved to Stone Ridge, New York, where it offers workshops and trainings as well as publishing materials pertaining to the Enneagram. It is represented by the Enneagram Institute Network in more than 15 countries. Hudson participated in revising the book Personality Types for the second edition, which came out in 1996.

Riso considered himself to be Enneagram type Four.

== Death ==
Riso died on August 30, 2012, from metastasized pancreatic cancer.

== Bibliography ==
- Don Richard Riso: Personality Types: Using the Enneagram for Self-Discovery, 1987

with Russ Hudson: revised ed., Boston: Houghton-Mifflin Co., 1996. ISBN 0-395-79867-1. ISBN 978-0-395-79867-6. books.google.com (preview)

- Don Richard Riso: Understanding the Enneagram, Houghton Mifflin Co., 1990

with Russ Hudson: Understanding the Enneagram. The Practical Guide to Personality Types. revised ed., Boston: Houghton-Mifflin Co., 2000. ISBN 0-618-00415-7. ISBN 978-0-618-00415-7. books.google.com (preview)

- Don Richard Riso and Russ Hudson: Enneagram Transformations. Releases and Affirmations for Healing Your Personality Type. Boston: Houghton-Mifflin Co., 1993. ISBN 0-395-65786-5. ISBN 978-0-395-65786-7. books.google.com (preview)
- Don Richard Riso and Russ Hudson: Discovering Your Personality Type

3. revised and enlarged edition, Boston: Houghton-Mifflin Co., 2003. ISBN 0-618-21903-X. ISBN 978-0-618-21903-2. books.google.com (preview)

- Don Richard Riso and Russ Hudson: The Wisdom of the Enneagram, New York: Bantam Books, 1999 ISBN 0-553-37820-1. ISBN 978-0-553-37820-7
