= 142857 =

Natural number, cyclic number

← 142856	142857	142858 →
- List of numbers; Integers; ← 10^{0} 10^{1} 10^{2} 10^{3} 10^{4} 10^{5} 10^{6} 10^{7} 10^{8} 10^{9} 10^{10} 10^{11} 10^{12} 10^{13}
- Cardinal: one hundred forty-two thousand eight hundred fifty-seven
- Ordinal: 142857th (one hundred forty-two thousand eight hundred fifty-seventh)
- Factorization: 3^{3} × 11 × 13 × 37
- Divisors: 1, 3, 9, 11, 13, 27, 33, 37, 39, 99, 111, 117, 143, 297, 333, 351, 407, 429, 481, 999, 1221, 1287, 1443, 3663, 3861, 4329, 5291, 10989, 12987, 15873, 47619, 142857
- Greek numeral: $\stackrel{\iota\delta}{\Mu}$͵βωνζ´
- Roman numeral: C̅X̅L̅MMDCCCLVII, c̅x̅l̅mmdccclvii
- Binary: 100010111000001001_{2}
- Ternary: 21020222000_{3}
- Senary: 3021213_{6}
- Octal: 427011_{8}
- Duodecimal: 6A809_{12}
- Hexadecimal: 22E09_{16}

142,857 is the natural number following 142,856 and preceding 142,858. It is both a Kaprekar number and a cyclic number.

== Cyclic number ==
142857 is the best-known cyclic number in base 10, being the six repeating digits of 1/7 (0.1̅4̅2̅8̅5̅7̅).

If 142857 is multiplied by 2, 3, 4, 5 or 6, the answer will be a cyclic permutation of itself, and will correspond to the repeating digits of 2/7, 3/7, 4/7, 5/7 or 6/7 respectively:

1 × 142,857 = 142,857
2 × 142,857 = 285,714
3 × 142,857 = 428,571
4 × 142,857 = 571,428
5 × 142,857 = 714,285
6 × 142,857 = 857,142
7 × 142,857 = 999,999

If multiplying by an integer greater than 7, there is a simple process to get to a cyclic permutation of 142857. By adding the rightmost six digits (ones through hundred thousands) to the remaining digits and repeating this process until only six digits are left, it will result in a cyclic permutation of 142857:

142857 × 8 = 1142856
1 + 142856 = 142857

142857 × 815 = 116428455
116 + 428455 = 428571

142857^{2} = 142857 × 142857 = 20408122449
20408 + 122449 = 142857

Multiplying by a multiple of 7 will result in 999999 through this process:

142857 × 7^{4} = 342999657
342 + 999657 = 999999

If you square the last three digits and subtract the square of the first three digits, you also get back a cyclic permutation of the number.

857^{2} = 734449
142^{2} = 20164
734449 − 20164 = 714285

It is the repeating part in the decimal expansion of the rational number 1/7 = 0.1̅4̅2̅8̅5̅7̅. Thus, multiples of 1/7 are simply repeated copies of the corresponding multiples of 142857:

$$\begin{align}
\tfrac17 & = 0.\overline{142857}\ldots \\[3pt]
\tfrac27 & = 0.\overline{285714}\ldots \\[3pt]
\tfrac37 & = 0.\overline{428571}\ldots \\[3pt]
\tfrac47 & = 0.\overline{571428}\ldots \\[3pt]
\tfrac57 & = 0.\overline{714285}\ldots \\[3pt]
\tfrac67 & = 0.\overline{857142}\ldots \\[3pt]
\tfrac77 & = 0.\overline{999999}\ldots = 1 \\[3pt]
\tfrac87 & = 1.\overline{142857}\ldots \\[3pt]
\tfrac97 & = 1.\overline{285714}\ldots \\
& \,\,\,\vdots
\end{align}$$

== Connection to the enneagram ==
The 142857 number sequence is used in the enneagram figure, a symbol of the Gurdjieff Work used to explain and visualize the dynamics of the interaction between the two great laws of the Universe (according to G. I. Gurdjieff), the Law of Three and the Law of Seven. The movement of the numbers of 142857 divided by 1/7, 2/7. etc., and the subsequent movement of the enneagram, are portrayed in Gurdjieff's sacred dances known as the movements.

== Other properties ==
The 142857 number sequence is also found in several decimals in which the denominator has a factor of 7. In the examples below, the numerators are all 1, however there are instances where it does not have to be, such as 2/7 (0.2̅8̅5̅7̅1̅4̅).

For example, consider the fractions and equivalent decimal values listed below:

1/7 = 0.1̅4̅2̅8̅5̅7̅...

1/14 = 0.07̅1̅4̅2̅8̅5̅...

1/28 = 0.035̅7̅1̅4̅2̅8̅...

1/35 = 0.02̅8̅5̅7̅1̅4̅...

1/56 = 0.0178̅5̅7̅1̅4̅2̅...

1/70 = 0.01̅4̅2̅8̅5̅7̅...

The above decimals follow the 142857 rotational sequence. There are fractions in which the denominator has a factor of 7, such as 1/21 and 1/42, that do not follow this sequence and have other values in their decimal digits.
