= Prime power =

Power of a prime number

In mathematics, a prime power is a positive integer that is a positive integer power of a single prime number. For example: 7 = 7^{1}, 9 = 3^{2} and 64 = 2^{6} are prime powers, while 6 = 2 × 3, 12 = 2^{2} × 3 and 36 = 6^{2} = 2^{2} × 3^{2} are not.

The sequence of prime powers begins:

2, 3, 4, 5, 7, 8, 9, 11, 13, 16, 17, 19, 23, 25, 27, 29, 31, 32, 37, 41, 43, 47, 49, 53, 59, 61, 64, 67, 71, 73, 79, 81, 83, 89, 97, 101, 103, 107, 109, 113, 121, 125, 127, 128, 131, 137, 139, 149, 151, 157, 163, 167, 169, 173, 179, 181, 191, 193, 197, 199, 211, 223, 227, 229, 233, 239, 241, 243, 251, ...

(sequence A246655 in the OEIS).

The prime powers are those positive integers that are divisible by exactly one prime number; in particular, the number 1 is not a prime power. Prime powers are also called primary numbers, as in the primary decomposition.

== Properties ==
=== Algebraic properties ===
Prime powers are powers of prime numbers. Every prime power excluding powers of 2 greater than 4 has a primitive root; thus the multiplicative group of integers modulo p^{n} (that is, the group of units of the ring Z/p^{n}Z) is cyclic.

The number of elements of a finite field is always a prime power and conversely, every prime power occurs as the number of elements in some finite field (which is unique up to isomorphism).

=== Combinatorial properties ===
A property of prime powers used frequently in analytic number theory is that the set of prime powers which are not prime is a small set in the sense that the infinite sum of their reciprocals converges, although the primes are a large set.

=== Divisibility properties ===
The totient function (φ) and sigma functions (σ_{0}) and (σ_{1}) of a prime power are calculated by the formulas

$$\varphi(p^n) = p^{n-1} \varphi(p) = p^{n-1} (p - 1) = p^n - p^{n-1} = p^n \left(1 - \frac{1}{p}\right),$$
$$\sigma_0(p^n) = \sum_{j=0}^{n} p^{0\cdot j} = \sum_{j=0}^{n} 1 = n+1,$$
$$\sigma_1(p^n) = \sum_{j=0}^{n} p^{1\cdot j} = \sum_{j=0}^{n} p^{j} = \frac{p^{n+1} - 1}{p - 1}.$$

All prime powers are deficient numbers. A prime power p^{n} is an n-almost prime. It is not known whether a prime power p^{n} can be a member of an amicable pair. If there is such a number, then p^{n} must be greater than 10^{1500} and n must be greater than 1400.

== See also ==
- Almost prime
- Fermi–Dirac prime
- Perfect power
- Semiprime
