= Giuga number =

Type of composite number

In number theory, a Giuga number is a composite number $n$ such that for each of its distinct prime factors $p_i$ we have $p_i | \left({n \over p_i} - 1\right)$, or equivalently such that for each of its distinct prime factors p_{i} we have $p_i^2 | (n - p_i)$. For example, 30 = 2 × 3 × 5 is a Giuga number since we can verify that:

- 30/2 − 1 = 14 = 2 × 7,
- 30/3 − 1 = 9 = 3^{2}, and
- 30/5 − 1 = 5.

The Giuga numbers are named after the mathematician Giuseppe Giuga, and relate to his conjecture on primality.

== Definitions ==
Alternative definition for a Giuga number due to Takashi Agoh is: a composite number n is a Giuga number if and only if the congruence

$$nB_{\varphi(n)} \equiv -1 \pmod n$$

holds true, where B is a Bernoulli number and $\varphi(n)$ is Euler's totient function.

An equivalent formulation due to Giuseppe Giuga is: a composite number n is a Giuga number if and only if the congruence

$$\sum_{i=1}^{n-1} i^{\varphi(n)} \equiv -1 \pmod n$$

and if and only if

$$\sum_{p|n} \frac{1}{p} - \prod_{p|n} \frac{1}{p} \in \mathbb{N}.$$

All known Giuga numbers n in fact satisfy the stronger condition

$$\sum_{p|n} \frac{1}{p} - \prod_{p|n} \frac{1}{p} = 1.$$

== List of numbers ==
Thirteen Giuga numbers are known. The list is complete up to the 12th term and for numbers with 8 or fewer prime factors, but it is unknown if there is a Giuga number between the 12th and 13th terms.

Rank	Number	Prime factorization
1	30	2 × 3 × 5
2	858	2 × 3 × 11 × 13
3	1722	2 × 3 × 7 × 41
4	66198	2 × 3 × 11 × 17 × 59
5	2214408306	2 × 3 × 11 × 23 × 31 × 47057
6	24423128562	2 × 3 × 7 × 43 × 3041 × 4447
7	432749205173838	2 × 3 × 7 × 59 × 163 × 1381 × 775807
8	14737133470010574	2 × 3 × 7 × 71 × 103 × 67213 × 713863
9	550843391309130318	2 × 3 × 7 × 71 × 103 × 61559 × 29133437
10	244197000982499715087866346	2 × 3 × 11 × 23 × 31 × 47137 × 28282147 × 3892535183
11	554079914617070801288578559178	2 × 3 × 11 × 23 × 31 × 47059 × 2259696349 × 110725121051
12	1910667181420507984555759916338506	2 × 3 × 7 × 43 × 1831 × 138683 × 2861051 × 1456230512169437
...
13?	42000179497077470620387115096706566324041957537516; 30609228764416142557211582098432545190323474818	2 × 3 × 11 × 23 × 31 × 47059 × 2217342227 × 1729101023519 × 8491659218261819498490029296021 × 58254480569119734123541298976556403
...

== Properties ==
The prime factors of a Giuga number must be distinct. If $p^2$ divides $n$, then it follows that ${n \over p} - 1 = m-1$, where $m=n/p$ is divisible by $p$. Hence, $m-1$ would not be divisible by $p$, and thus $n$ would not be a Giuga number.

Thus, only square-free integers can be Giuga numbers. For example, the factors of 60 are 2, 2, 3 and 5, and 60/2 - 1 = 29, which is not divisible by 2. Thus, 60 is not a Giuga number.

This rules out squares of primes, but semiprimes cannot be Giuga numbers either. For if $n=p_1p_2$, with $p_1<p_2$ primes, then ${n \over p_2} - 1 =p_1 - 1 <p_2$, so $p_2$ will not divide ${n \over p_2} - 1$, and thus $n$ is not a Giuga number.

Unsolved problem in mathematics
Are there infinitely many Giuga numbers? Is there a composite Giuga number that is also a Carmichael number?
More unsolved problems in mathematics

All known Giuga numbers are even. If an odd Giuga number exists, it must be the product of at least 14 primes. It is not known if there are infinitely many Giuga numbers.

It has been conjectured by Paolo P. Lava (2009) that Giuga numbers are the solutions of the differential equation n' = n+1, where n' is the arithmetic derivative of n. (For square-free numbers $n = \prod_i {p_i}$, $n' = \sum_i \frac{n}{p_i}$, so n' = n+1 is just the last equation in the above section Definitions, multiplied by n.)

José Mª Grau and Antonio Oller-Marcén have shown that an integer n is a Giuga number if and only if it satisfies n' = a n + 1 for some integer a > 0, where n' is the arithmetic derivative of n. (Again, n' = a n + 1 is identical to the third equation in Definitions, multiplied by n.)

== See also ==
- Carmichael number
- Primary pseudoperfect number
- Znám's problem
