= Fermi–Dirac prime =

Prime power with exponent 2^k

In number theory, a Fermi–Dirac prime is a prime power whose exponent is a power of two. Each positive integer has a unique representation as a product of Fermi–Dirac primes without repetition. These numbers are named from an analogy to Fermi–Dirac statistics in physics, based on the lack of repetition in these factorizations.

Each element in the sequence of Fermi–Dirac primes is the smallest positive integer that does not divide the product of all previous elements. Srinivasa Ramanujan showed that the product of the smallest $k$ Fermi–Dirac primes is the smallest number whose number of divisors is $2^k$. The Fermi–Dirac primes form the basis of a binary numeral system in which multiplication may be performed digit-by-digit.

== Definition ==
The Fermi–Dirac primes are a sequence of numbers obtained by raising a prime number to an exponent that is a power of two. That is, these are the numbers of the form
$$p^{2^k}$$
where $p$ is a prime number and $k$ is a non-negative integer. Another way of expressing this formula is that it is the value obtained by repeated squaring, $k$ times, starting from the prime number $p$: Squaring $p$ produces $p^2$, then squaring $p^2$ produces $p^4$, etc.

The Fermi–Dirac primes, in numeric order, form the sequence:

2, 3, 4, 5, 7, 9, 11, 13, 16, 17, 19, 23, 25, 29, 31, 37, ... (sequence A050376 in the OEIS).

Each number in this sequence is the smallest positive integer that does not divide the product of all of the previous elements of the sequence. For instance, 2 is the smallest positive integer that does not divide the empty product, which equals one. 3 does not divide 2, 4 does not divide 2 · 3 = 6, and 5 does not divide 2 · 3 · 4 = 24, etc. The set of Fermi–Dirac primes is the minimal set of numbers that includes all of the prime numbers and is closed under squaring.

== Factorization ==
Every positive integer has a unique prime factorization, its representation as a product of prime numbers, allowing some of these numbers to be repeated. Analogously, every positive integer also has a unique factorization as a product of Fermi–Dirac primes, with no repetitions allowed. The Fermi–Dirac factorization can be obtained from the prime factorization by grouping the copies of each prime number into powers of two, according to the binary representation of the number of copies. For example,
$$\begin{align}
2400 &= 2\cdot 2\cdot 2\cdot 2\cdot 2\cdot 3\cdot 5\cdot 5 \\
&= 2^{4 + 1}\cdot 3\cdot 5^2\\
&= 16\cdot 2\cdot 3\cdot 25\\
&= 2 \cdot 3 \cdot 16 \cdot 25,
\end{align}$$
where the first line is the factorization of 2400 into primes, the second line expands the number of copies of the prime 2 (five copies) into powers of two (5 = 101_{2} = 4 + 1), the third line is the corresponding factorization into Fermi–Dirac primes, and the last line reorders the Fermi–Dirac primes numerically.

The Fermi–Dirac primes are named from an analogy to particle physics. In physics, bosons are particles that obey Bose–Einstein statistics, in which it is allowed for multiple particles to be in the same state at the same time. Fermions are particles that obey Fermi–Dirac statistics, which only allow a single particle in each state. Similarly, for the usual prime numbers, multiple copies of the same prime number can appear in the same prime factorization, but factorizations into a product of Fermi–Dirac primes only allow each Fermi–Dirac prime to appear once within the product.

== Numeral representation ==
The Fermi–Dirac factorization can be used for a system of binary numerals for the positive integers, different from the standard binary representation as a sum of powers of two. The Fermi–Dirac representation of a number is a binary sequence whose bit in position $i$ is 1 if the $i$th Fermi–Dirac prime appears in its factorization, and 0 otherwise. As with standard binary numerals, this can be written in the order from most significant to least significant bit and truncated to avoid leading zeros. For instance, the representation for 2400 would be 10001000011, with ones in the positions for the Fermi–Dirac primes 25, 16, 3, and 2, and zeros in the remaining positions.

This representation allows multiplication and division to be performed digit-by-digit, analogously to the digit-by-digit methods for adding and subtracting numbers in their standard binary or decimal representations. For instance, multiplying two numbers involves comparing the two bits at each position of the Fermi–Dirac representations of the numbers, together with a carry bit from earlier positions. When an odd number of these three bits is nonzero, the product has a 1 in that position, and otherwise it has a 0, the same rule as for binary addition. And when two or three of these three bits are nonzero, a 1 is carried to the position of the square of the Fermi–Dirac prime in that position, the same rule for determining the carry bits in binary addition.

== Other properties ==
The Fermi–Dirac primes can be used to find the smallest number that has exactly $n$ divisors, in the case that $n$ is a power of two, $n=2^k$. In this case, as Srinivasa Ramanujan proved, the smallest number with $n=2^k$ divisors is the product of the $k$ smallest Fermi–Dirac primes. Its divisors are the numbers obtained by multiplying together any subset of these $k$ Fermi–Dirac primes. For instance, the smallest number with 1024 divisors is obtained by multiplying together the first ten Fermi–Dirac primes:
$$294053760 = 2\cdot 3\cdot 4\cdot 5\cdot 7\cdot 9\cdot 11\cdot 13\cdot 16\cdot 17.$$

In the theory of infinitary divisors of Cohen, the Fermi–Dirac primes are exactly the numbers whose only infinitary divisors are 1 and the number itself.
