= Necklace ring =

Ring theory

In mathematics, the necklace ring is a ring introduced by Metropolis and Rota (1983) to elucidate the multiplicative properties of necklace polynomials.

== Definition ==
If A is a commutative ring then the necklace ring over A consists of all infinite sequences $(a_1, a_2, ...)$ of elements of A. Addition in the necklace ring is given by pointwise addition of sequences. Multiplication is given by a sort of arithmetic convolution: the product of $(a_1, a_2, ...)$ and $(b_1, b_2, ...)$ has components

$$\displaystyle c_n=\sum_{[i,j]=n}(i,j)a_ib_j$$

where $[i,j]$ is the least common multiple of $i$ and $j$, and $(i,j)$ is their greatest common divisor.

This ring structure is isomorphic to the multiplication of formal power series written in "necklace coordinates": that is, identifying an integer sequence $(a_1, a_2, ...)$ with the power series $\textstyle\prod_{n\geq 0} (1{-}t^n)^{-a_n}$.

== See also ==
- Witt vector
