= Agoh–Giuga conjecture =

Number theory conjecture

In number theory, the Agoh–Giuga conjecture on the Bernoulli numbers $B_k$ postulates that $p$ is a prime number if and only if

$$pB_{p-1} \equiv -1 \!\pmod p.$$

It is named after Takashi Agoh and Giuseppe Giuga.

== Equivalent formulation ==
The conjecture as stated above is due to Takashi Agoh; an equivalent formulation is due to Giuseppe Giuga, from 1950, to the effect that $p$ is prime if and only if

$$1^{p-1}+2^{p-1}+ \cdots +(p-1)^{p-1} \equiv -1 \!\pmod p$$,

which may also be written as

$$\sum_{i=1}^{p-1} i^{p-1} \equiv -1 \!\pmod p.$$

It is trivial to show that $p$ being prime is sufficient for the second equivalence to hold, since if $p$ is prime, Fermat's little theorem states that

$$a^{p-1} \equiv 1 \pmod p$$

for $a = 1,2,\dots,p-1$, and the equivalence follows since $p-1 \equiv -1 \!\pmod p.$

== Status ==
The statement is still a conjecture since it has not yet been proven that if a number $n$ is not prime (that is, if $n$ is composite), then the formula does not hold. It has been shown that a composite number $n$ satisfies the formula if and only if it is both a Carmichael number and a Giuga number, and that if such a number exists, it has at least 13,800 digits. In 2001, Sorini showed that a possible counterexample should be greater than 10^{36067}, which represents the limit suggested by Bedocchi for the demonstration technique specified by Giuga to his own conjecture.

== Relation to Wilson's theorem ==
The Agoh–Giuga conjecture bears a similarity to Wilson's theorem, which has been proven to be true. Wilson's theorem states that a number $p$ is prime if and only if

$$(p-1)! \equiv -1 \!\pmod p,$$

which may also be written as

$$\prod_{i=1}^{p-1} i \equiv -1 \!\pmod p.$$

For an odd prime $p$ we have

$$\prod_{i=1}^{p-1} i^{p-1} \equiv (-1)^{p-1} \equiv 1 \!\pmod p,$$

and for $p=2$ we have

$$\prod_{i=1}^{p-1} i^{p-1} \equiv (-1)^{p-1} \equiv 1 \!\pmod p.$$

So, the truth of the Agoh–Giuga conjecture combined with Wilson's theorem gives: a number $p$ is prime if and only if

$$\sum_{i=1}^{p-1} i^{p-1} \equiv -1 \!\pmod p$$

and

$$\prod_{i=1}^{p-1} i^{p-1} \equiv 1 \!\pmod p.$$

== See also ==
- Bernoulli number § Arithmetical properties of the Bernoulli numbers
