= Štefan Znám =

Štefan Znám (9 February 1936, Veľký Blh – 17 July 1993, Bratislava) was a Slovak-Hungarian mathematician, believed to be the first to ponder Znám's problem in modern times.

Znám worked in the field of number theory and graph theory. He also co-founded journal Matematické obzory.
