= 1722 (number) =

← 1721	1722	1723 →
- List of numbers; Integers; ← 0 1k 2k 3k 4k 5k 6k 7k 8k 9k →
- Cardinal: one thousand seven hundred twenty-two
- Ordinal: 1722nd (one thousand seven hundred twenty-second)
- Factorization: 2 × 3 × 7 × 41
- Divisors: 1, 2, 1722
- Greek numeral: ,ΑΨΚΒ´
- Roman numeral: MDCCXXII, mdccxxii
- Binary: 11010111010_{2}
- Ternary: 2100210_{3}
- Senary: 11550_{6}
- Octal: 3272_{8}
- Duodecimal: BB6_{12}
- Hexadecimal: 6BA_{16}

1722 (one thousand seven hundred [and] twenty-two) is the natural number following 1721 and preceding 1723.

== In mathematics ==
1722 is an even composite number that is a pronic number, the product of exactly four distinct primes, a 4-digit term in the continued fraction for pi, and the least possible number of diagonals of simple convex polyhedron with 46 face.

It is the number of 8-node graphs that are not determined by their spectrum, and the number of strings of length 4 over a 7-letter alphabet that do not begin with a palindrome

1722 is most notable for being a Giuga number, specifically the third one, since it is a composite number $n$ whose prime factors $p$, 2, 3, 7, and 41, divides $(n/p-1)$. This can be expressed as:

$1/2 + 1/3 + 1/7 + 1/41- 1/1722 = 1$.

It is the largest Giuga number with 4 prime factors.
