= P-derivation =

Differential mapping

In mathematics, more specifically differential algebra, a p-derivation (for p a prime number) on a ring R, is a mapping from R to R that satisfies certain conditions outlined directly below. The notion of a p-derivation is related to that of a derivation in differential algebra.

== Definition ==
Let p be a prime number. A p-derivation or Buium derivative on a ring $R$ is a map $\delta:R\to R$ that satisfies the following "product rule":

$$\delta_p(ab) = \delta_p (a)b^p + a^p\delta_p (b) + p\delta_p (a)\delta_p (b)$$

and "sum rule":

$$\delta_p(a+b) = \delta_p (a) + \delta_p(b) + \frac{a^p +b^p - (a+b)^p }{p},$$

as well as

$$\delta_p(1) = 0.$$

Note that in the "sum rule" we are not really dividing by p, since all the relevant binomial coefficients in the numerator are divisible by p, so this definition applies in the case when $R$ has p-torsion.

== Relation to Frobenius endomorphisms ==
A map $\sigma: R \to R$ is a lift of the Frobenius endomorphism provided $\sigma(x) = x^p \pmod {pR}$. An example of such a lift could come from the Artin map.

If $(R, \delta)$ is a ring with a p-derivation, then the map $\sigma(x) := x^p + p\delta(x)$ defines a ring endomorphism which is a lift of the Frobenius endomorphism. When the ring R is p-torsion free the correspondence is a bijection.

== Examples ==
- For $R = \mathbb Z$ the unique p-derivation is the map

$$\delta(x) = \frac{x-x^p}{p}.$$

The quotient is well-defined because of Fermat's little theorem.

- If R is any p-torsion free ring and $\sigma:R \to R$ is a lift of the Frobenius endomorphism then

$$\delta(x) = \frac{\sigma(x)-x^p}{p}$$

defines a p-derivation.

== See also ==
- Witt vector
- Arithmetic derivative
- Derivation
- Fermat quotient
