= Witt vector =

Mathematical concept named for Ernst Witt

In mathematics, a Witt vector is an infinite sequence of elements of a commutative ring. Ernst Witt showed how to put a ring structure on the set of Witt vectors, in such a way that the ring of Witt vectors $W(\mathbb{F}_p)$ over the finite field of prime order p is isomorphic to $\mathbb{Z}_p$, the ring of p-adic integers. They have a highly non-intuitive structure upon first glance because their additive and multiplicative structure depends on an infinite set of recursive formulas which do not behave like addition and multiplication formulas for standard p-adic integers.

The main idea behind Witt vectors is that instead of using the standard p-adic expansion

$a = a_0+a_1p+a_2p^2 + \cdots$

to represent an element in $\mathbb{Z}_p$, an expansion using the Teichmüller character can be considered instead;

$\omega: \mathbb{F}_p^* \to \mathbb{Z}_p^*$,

which is a group morphism sending each element in the solution set of $x^{p-1}-1$ in $\mathbb{F}_p$ to an element in the solution set of $x^{p-1}-1$ in $\mathbb{Z}_p$. That is, the elements in $\mathbb{Z}_p$ can be expanded out in terms of roots of unity instead of as profinite elements in $\prod \mathbb{F}_p$. We also set $\omega(0)=0$, which defines an injective multiplicative map $\omega: \mathbb{F}_p \to \mathbb{Z}_p$ sending elements of $\mathbb{F}_p$ to roots of $x^p-x$ in $\mathbb{Z}_p$. A p-adic integer can then be expressed as an infinite sum

$a = \omega(a_0) + \omega(a_1)p + \omega(a_2)p^2 + \cdots$,

which gives a Witt vector

$(a_0, a_1, a_2,\ldots)\in W(\mathbb{F}_p)= (\mathbb{F}_p)^{\mathbb{N}}$.

Then, the non-trivial additive and multiplicative structure in Witt vectors comes from using this map to give $W(\mathbb{F}_p)$ an additive and multiplicative structure such that $\omega$ induces a commutative ring homomorphism.

== History ==
In the 19th century, Ernst Eduard Kummer studied cyclic extensions of fields as part of his work on Fermat's Last Theorem. This led to the subject known as Kummer theory. Let $k$ be a field containing a primitive $n$-th root of unity. Kummer theory classifies degree $n$ cyclic field extensions $K$ of $k$. Such fields are in bijection with order $n$ cyclic groups $\Delta \subseteq k^\times / (k^\times)^n$, where $\Delta$ corresponds to $K=k(\sqrt[n]{\Delta}\,)$.

But suppose that $k$ has characteristic $p$. The problem of studying degree $p$ extensions of $k$, or more generally degree $p^n$ extensions, may appear superficially similar to Kummer theory. However, in this situation, $k$ cannot contain a primitive $p$-th root of unity. If $x$ is a $p$-th root of unity in $k$, then it satisfies $x^p=1$. But consider the expression $(x-1)^p=0$. By expanding using binomial coefficients, the operation of raising to the $p$-th power, known here as the Frobenius homomorphism, introduces the factor $p$ to every coefficient except the first and the last, and so modulo $p$ these equations are the same. Therefore $x = 1$. Consequently, Kummer theory is never applicable to extensions whose degree is divisible by the characteristic.

The case where the characteristic divides the degree is today called Artin–Schreier theory because the first progress was made by Artin and Schreier. Their initial motivation was the Artin–Schreier theorem, which characterizes the real closed fields as those whose absolute Galois group has order two. This inspired them to ask what other fields had finite absolute Galois groups. In the midst of proving that no other such fields exist, they proved that degree $p$ extensions of a field $k$ of characteristic $p$ were the same as splitting fields of Artin–Schreier polynomials. These are by definition of the form $x^p-x-a.$ By repeating their construction, they described degree $p^2$ extensions. Abraham Adrian Albert used this idea to describe degree $p^n$ extensions. Each repetition entailed complicated algebraic conditions to ensure that the field extension was normal.

Schmid generalized further to non-commutative cyclic algebras of degree $p^n$. In the process of doing so, certain polynomials related to the addition of $p$-adic integers appeared. Witt seized on these polynomials. By using them systematically, he was able to give simple and unified constructions of degree $p^n$ field extensions and cyclic algebras. Specifically, he introduced a ring now called $W_n(k)$, the ring of $n$-truncated $p$-typical Witt vectors. This ring has $k$ as a quotient, and it comes with an operator $F$ which is called the Frobenius operator since it reduces to the Frobenius operator on $k$. Witt observed that the degree $p^n$ analog of Artin–Schreier polynomials is

$$F(x)-x-a$$,

where $a \in W_n(k)$. To complete the analogy with Kummer theory, define $\wp$ to be the operator $x \mapsto F(x)-x.$ Then the degree $p^n$ extensions of $k$ are in bijective correspondence with cyclic subgroups $\Delta \subseteq W_n(k) / \wp(W_n(k))$ of order $p^n$, where $\Delta$ corresponds to the field $k(\wp^{-1}(\Delta))$.

== Motivation ==
Any $p$-adic integer (an element of $\Z_p$, not to be confused with $\Z/p\Z=\mathbb{F}_p$) can be written as a power series $a_0+a_1p^1+a_2p^2+\cdots$, where the $a_i$ are usually taken from the integer interval $[0,p-1]=\{0,1,2,\ldots,p-1\}$. It can be difficult to provide an algebraic expression for addition and multiplication using this representation, as one faces the problem of carrying between digits. However, taking representative coefficients $a_i\in [0,p-1]$ is only one of many choices, and Hensel himself (the creator of $p$-adic numbers) suggested the roots of unity in the field as representatives. These representatives are therefore the number $0$ together with the $(p-1)^{\text{st}}$ roots of unity; that is, the solutions of $x^p - x = 0$ in $\Z_p$, so that $a_i=a_i^p$. This choice extends naturally to ring extensions of $\Z_p$ in which the residue field is enlarged to $\mathbb{F}_q$ with $q=p^f$, some power of $p$. Indeed, it is these fields (the fields of fractions of the rings) that motivated Hensel's choice. Now the representatives are the $q$ solutions in the field to $x^q-x=0$. Call the field $\Z_p(\eta)$, with $\eta$ an appropriate primitive $(q-1)^{\text{th}}$ root of unity (over $\Z_p$). The representatives are then $0$ and $\eta^i$ for $0\leq i\leq q-2$. Since these representatives form a multiplicative set they can be thought of as characters. Some thirty years after Hensel's works, Teichmüller studied these characters, which now bear his name, and this led him to a characterisation of the structure of the whole field in terms of the residue field. These Teichmüller representatives can be identified with the elements of the finite field $\mathbb{F}_q$ of order $q$ by taking residues modulo $p$ in $\Z_p(\eta)$, and elements of $\mathbb{F}_q^\times$ are taken to their representatives by the Teichmüller character $\omega:\mathbb{F}_q^\times\to\Z_p(\eta)^\times$. This operation identifies the set of integers in $\Z_p(\eta)$ with infinite sequences of elements of $\omega(\mathbb{F}_q^\times)\cup\{0\}$.

Taking those representatives, the expressions for addition and multiplication can be written in closed form. The following problem (stated for the simplest case: $q=p$): given two infinite sequences of elements of $\omega(\mathbb{F}_p^\times)\cup\{0\}$, describe their sum and product as p-adic integers explicitly. This problem was solved by Witt using Witt vectors.

=== Detailed motivational sketch ===
The ring of $p$-adic integers $\Z_p$ is derived from the finite field $\mathbb{F}_p=\Z /p\Z$ using a construction which naturally generalizes to the Witt vector construction.

The ring $\Z_p$ of p-adic integers can be understood as the inverse limit of the rings $\Z /p^i\Z$ taken along the projections. Specifically, it consists of the sequences $(n_0,n_1,\ldots)$ with $n_i\in\Z/p^{i+1}\Z$, such that $n_j\equiv n_i\bmod p^{i+1}$ for $j\ge i$. That is, each successive element of the sequence is equal to the previous elements modulo a lower power of p; this is the inverse limit of the projections $\Z/p^{i+1}\Z\to\Z/p^i\Z$.

The elements of $\Z_p$ can be expanded as (formal) power series in $p$

$$a_0+a_1p^1+a_2p^2+\cdots$$,

where the coefficients $a_i$ are taken from the integer interval $[0,p-1]=\{0,1,\ldots,p-1\}$. This power series usually will not converge in $\R$ using the standard metric on the reals, but it will converge in $\Z_p$ with the p-adic metric.

Letting $a+b$ be denoted by $c$, the following definition can be considered for addition:

$$\begin{align}
c_0 &\equiv a_0+b_0 && \bmod p \\
c_0+c_1 p &\equiv (a_0+b_0) + (a_1 +b_1)p && \bmod p^2 \\
c_0+c_1 p+c_2 p^2 &\equiv (a_0+b_0) + (a_1 +b_1)p+(a_2+b_2) p^2 &&\bmod p^3
\end{align}$$

and a similar definition for multiplication can be made. However, this is not a closed formula, since the new coefficients need not be in the allowed set $[0,p-1]$; take for instance when $a_0, b_0 > p/2$. In general, one must carry powers of $p$ to simplify the given sum into a form with coefficients in the allowed set.

==== Representing elements in F_{p} as elements in the ring of Witt vectors W(F_{p}) ====
There is a coefficient subset of $\Z_p$ which does yield closed formulas, the Teichmüller representatives: zero together with the $(p-1)^{\text{th}}$ roots of unity. They can be explicitly calculated (in terms of the original coefficient representatives $[0,p-1]$) as roots of $x^{p-1}-1=0$ through Hensel lifting, the p-adic version of Newton's method. For example, in $\Z_5$, to calculate the representative of 2, one starts by finding the unique solution of $x^4-1=0$ in $\Z/25\Z$ with $x\equiv2\bmod5$; one gets 7. Repeating this in $\Z/125\Z$, with the conditions $x^4-1=0$ and $x\equiv7\bmod25$, gives 57, and so on; the resulting Teichmüller representative of 2, denoted $\omega(2)$, is the sequence

$\omega(2)=(2,7,57,\ldots)\in W(\mathbb{F}_5)$.

The existence of a lift in each step is guaranteed by the greatest common divisor $(x^{p-1}-1,(p-1)x^{p-2})=1$ in every $\Z/p^n\Z$.

This algorithm shows that for every $j\in[0,p-1]$, there is one Teichmüller representative with $a_0=j$, which is denoted $\omega(j)$. This defines the Teichmüller character $\omega:\mathbb{F}_p^*\to\Z_p^*$ as a (multiplicative) group homomorphism, which moreover satisfies $m\circ \omega=\mathrm{id}_{\mathbb{F}_p}$ if one lets $m:\Z_p\to \Z_p/p\Z_p \cong \mathbb{F}_p$ denote the canonical projection. Note however that $\omega$ is not additive, as the sum need not be a representative. Despite this, if $\omega(k) \equiv \omega(i)+\omega(j)\bmod p$ in $\Z_p,$ then $i+j=k$ in $\mathbb{F}_p.$

==== Representing elements in Z_{p} as elements in the ring of Witt vectors W(F_{p}) ====
Because of this one-to-one correspondence given by $\omega$, one can expand every p-adic integer as a power series in p with coefficients taken from the Teichmüller representatives. An explicit algorithm can be given, as follows. Write the Teichmüller representative as $\omega(t_0)=t_0+t_1p^1+t_2p^2+\cdots$. Then, if one has some arbitrary p-adic integer of the form $x=x_0+x_1p^1+x_2p^2+\cdots$, one takes the difference $x-\omega(x_0)=x'_1p^1+x'_2p^2+\cdots$, leaving a value divisible by $p$. Hence, $x-\omega(x_0)=0\bmod p$. The process is then repeated, subtracting $\omega(x'_1)p$ and proceed likewise. This yields a sequence of congruences

$$\begin{align}x&\equiv\omega(x_0)&&\bmod p\\x&\equiv\omega(x_0)+\omega(x'_1)p&& \bmod p^2\\&\cdots\end{align}$$

so that

$$x\equiv\sum_{j=0}^i\omega(\bar{x}_j)p^j\bmod p^{i+1}$$

and $i' > i$ implies

$$\sum_{j = 0}^{i'} \omega(\bar{x}_j)p^j \equiv \sum_{j=0}^i \omega(\bar{x}_j)p^j \bmod p^{i+1}$$

for

$$\bar{x}_i:=m\biggl(\frac{1}{p^i}\biggl[x-\sum_{j=0}^{i-1}\omega(\bar{x}_j)p^j\biggr]\biggr)$$.

This obtains a power series for each residue of $x$ modulo powers of $p$, but with coefficients in the Teichmüller representatives rather than $\{0,\ldots,p-1\}$.

$$\sum_{j=0}^\infty\omega(\bar{x}_j)p^j=x$$,

since

$$p^{i+1}\mid x-\sum_{j=0}^i\omega(\bar{x}_j)p^j$$

for all $i$ as $i\to\infty$, so the difference tends to 0 with respect to the p-adic metric. The resulting coefficients will typically differ from the $a_i$ modulo $p^i$ except the first one.

==== Additional properties of elements in the ring of Witt vectors motivating general definition ====
The Teichmüller coefficients have the key additional property that $\omega(\bar{x}_i)^p=\omega(\bar{x}_i),$ which is missing for the numbers in $[0,p-1]$. This can be used to describe addition, as follows. Consider the equation $c = a+b$ in $\mathbb{Z}_p$ and let the coefficients $a_i, b_i, c_i \in \mathbb{Z}_p$ now be as in the Teichmüller expansion. Since the Teichmüller character is not additive, $c_0=a_0+b_0$ is not true in $\Z_p$, but it holds in $\mathbb{F}_p$, as the first congruence implies. In particular,

$$c_0^p\equiv(a_0+b_0)^p\bmod p^2$$

and thus

$$c_0-a_0-b_0\equiv(a_0+b_0)^p-a_0-b_0\equiv\binom{p}{1}a_0^{p-1}b_0+\cdots+\binom{p}{p-1}a_0b_0^{p-1}\bmod p^2$$.

Since the binomial coefficient $\binom{p}{i}$ is divisible by $p$, this gives

$$c_1\equiv a_1+b_1-a_0^{p-1}b_0-\frac{p-1}{2}a_0^{p-2}b_0^2-\cdots-a_0b_0^{p-1}\bmod p$$.

This completely determines $c_1$ by the lift. Moreover, the congruence modulo $p$ indicates that the calculation can actually be done in $\mathbb{F}_p,$ satisfying the basic aim of defining a simple additive structure.

For $c_2$ this step can be cumbersome. Write

$$c_1=c_1^p\equiv\left(a_1+b_1-a_0^{p-1}b_0-\frac{p-1}{2}a_0^{p-2}b_0^2-\cdots-a_0b_0^{p-1}\right)^p\bmod p^2$$.

Just as for $c_0$, a single $p$th power is not enough: one must take

$$c_0=c_0^{p^2}\equiv(a_0+b_0)^{p^2} \bmod p^3.$$

However, $\binom{p^2}{i}$ is not in general divisible by $p^2$, but it is divisible when $i=pd$, in which case $a^ib^{p^2-i}=a^db^{p-d}$ combined with similar monomials in $c_1^p$ will make a multiple of $p^2$.

At this step, one works with addition of the form

$$\begin{align}
c_0 &\equiv a_0+b_0 && \bmod p \\
c_0^p+c_1 p &\equiv a_0^p+a_1 p+b_0^p+b_1 p && \bmod p^2 \\
c_0^{p^2}+c_1^p p+c_2 p^2 &\equiv a_0^{p^2}+a_1^p p+a_2 p^2+b_0^{p^2}+b_1^p p+b_2 p^2 && \bmod p^3
\end{align}$$

This motivates the definition of Witt vectors.

== Construction of Witt rings ==
Fix a prime number p. A Witt vector over a commutative ring $R$ (relative to the prime $p$) is a sequence $(X_0,X_1,X_2,\ldots)$ of elements of $R$. The Witt polynomials $W_i$ can be defined by

1. $W_0=X_0$
2. $W_1=X_0^p+pX_1$
3. $W_2=X_0^{p^2}+pX_1^p+p^2X_2$

and in general

$$W_n=\sum_{i=0}^np^iX_i^{p^{n-i}}$$.

The $W_n$ are called the ghost components of the Witt vector $(X_0,X_1,X_2,\ldots)$, and are usually denoted by $X^{(n)}$; taken together, the $W_n$ define the ghost map to $\prod_{i=0}^\infty R$. If $R$ is p-torsionfree, then the ghost map is injective and the ghost components can be thought of as an alternative coordinate system for the $R$-module of sequences (though note that the ghost map is not surjective unless $R$ is p-divisible).

The ring of (p-typical) Witt vectors $W(R)$ is defined by componentwise addition and multiplication of the ghost components. That is, that there is a unique way to make the set of Witt vectors over any commutative ring $R$ into a ring such that:

1. the sum and product are given by polynomials with integer coefficients that do not depend on $R$, and
2. projection to each ghost component is a ring homomorphism from the Witt vectors over $R$, to $R$.

In other words,

- $(X+Y)_i$ and $(XY)_i$ are given by polynomials with integer coefficients that do not depend on R, and
- $X^{(i)}+Y^{(i)} = (X+Y)^{(i)}$ and $X^{(i)}Y^{(i)} = (XY)^{(i)}.$

The first few polynomials giving the sum and product of Witt vectors can be written down explicitly. For example,

$$(X_0,X_1,\ldots)+(Y_0,Y_1,\ldots)=(X_0+Y_0, X_1+Y_1-((X_0+Y_0)^p - X_0^p -Y_0^p)/p,\ldots)$$
$$(X_0,X_1,\ldots)\times(Y_0,Y_1,\ldots)=(X_0 Y_0, X_0^p Y_1+X_1 Y_0^p+p X_1 Y_1,\ldots)$$

These are to be understood as shortcuts for the actual formulas: if for example the ring $R$ has characteristic $p$, the division by $p$ in the first formula above, the one by $p^2$ that would appear in the next component and so forth, do not make sense. However, if the $p$-power of the sum is developed, the terms $X_0^p+Y_0^p$ are cancelled with the previous ones and the remaining ones are simplified by $p$, no division by $p$ remains and the formula makes sense. The same consideration applies to the ensuing components.

=== Examples of addition and multiplication ===
As would be expected, the identity element in the ring of Witt vectors $W(A)$ is the element

$\underline{1} = (1,0,0,\ldots)$

Adding this element to itself gives a non-trivial sequence, for example in $W(\mathbb{F}_5)$,

$\underline{1} + \underline{1} = (2,4,\ldots)$

since

$$\begin{align}
2 &= 1 + 1\\
4 &= -\frac{32 - 1 - 1}{5} \mod 5 \\
&\cdots
\end{align}$$

which is not the expected behavior, since it doesn't equal $\underline{2}$. But, when the map $m:W(\mathbb{F}_5) \to \mathbb{F}_5$ is reduced with, one gets $m(\omega(1) + \omega(1)) = m(\omega(2))$. Note if there is an element $x \in A$ and an element $a \in W(A)$, then

$\underline{x}a = (xa_0,x^pa_1,\ldots,x^{p^n}a_n,\ldots)$

showing that multiplication also behaves in a highly non-trivial manner.

== Examples ==
- The Witt ring of any commutative ring $R$ in which $p$ is invertible, is isomorphic to $R^\N$ (the product of a countable number of copies of $R$). The Witt polynomials always give a homomorphism from the ring of Witt vectors to $R^\N$, and if $p$ is invertible this homomorphism is an isomorphism.
- The Witt ring $W(\mathbb{F}_p) \cong \mathbb{Z}_p$ of the finite field of order $p$ is the ring of $p$-adic integers written in terms of the Teichmüller representatives, as demonstrated above.
- The Witt ring $W(\mathbb{F}_q) \cong \mathcal{O}_K$ of a finite field of order $p^n$ is the ring of integers of the unique unramified extension of degree $n$ of the ring of $p$-adic numbers $K/\mathbb{Q}_p$. Note $K \cong \mathbb{Q}_p(\mu_{q-1})$ for $\mu_{q-1}$ the $(q-1)$-st root of unity, hence $W(\mathbb{F}_q) \cong \mathbb{Z}_p[\mu_{q-1}]$.
- The truncated Witt ring $W_{n+1}(\mathbb{F}_p[t])$ can be described as

$\begin{array}{rcl} W_{n+1}(\mathbb{F}_p[t]) &\cong& \left \{ \sum a_i t^{i/p^n} \in (\mathbb{Z}/p^{n+1})[t^{1/p^n}] \ :\ p i a_i = 0 \ \textrm{ mod } \ p^{n+1} \right \} \\ &=& (\mathbb{Z}/p^n)[t] + p(\mathbb{Z}/p^n)[t^{1/p}] + p^2(\mathbb{Z}/p^n)[t^{1/p^2}] + \dots + p^n(\mathbb{Z}/p^n)[t^{1/p^n}] \end{array}$

The Witt vectors are the inverse limit along the canonical projections

$W(\mathbb{F}_p[t]) = \lim (\dots \to W_{n+1}(\mathbb{F}_p[t]) \to W_{n}(\mathbb{F}_p[t]) \to \dots \to W_1(\mathbb{F}_p[t]) = \mathbb{F}_p[t]).$

Here the transition homomorphisms are induced by reduction $(\mathbb{Z}/p^{n+1})[t^{1/p^n}] \to (\mathbb{Z}/p^{n})[t^{1/p^n}]$.

== Universal Witt vectors ==
The Witt polynomials for different primes $p$ are special cases of universal Witt polynomials, which can be used to form a universal Witt ring (not depending on a choice of prime $p$). Define the universal Witt polynomials $W_n$ for $n\geq1$ by

1. $W_1=X_1$
2. $W_2=X_1^2+2X_2$
3. $W_3=X_1^3+3X_3$
4. $W_4=X_1^{4}+2X_2^2+4X_4$

and in general

$$W_n=\sum_{d|n}dX_d^{n/d}$$.

Again, $(W_1,W_2,W_3,\ldots)$ is called the vector of ghost components of the Witt vector $(X_1,X_2,X_3,\ldots)$, and is usually denoted by $(X^{(1)},X^{(2)},X^{(3)},\ldots)$.

These polynomials can be used to define the ring of universal Witt vectors or big Witt ring of any commutative ring $R$ in much the same way as above (so the universal Witt polynomials are all homomorphisms to the ring $R$).

== Generating functions ==
Witt also provided another approach using generating functions.

=== Definition ===
Let $X$ be a Witt vector and define

$$f_X(t)=\prod_{n\ge 1}(1-X_n t^n)=\sum_{n\ge 0}A_n t^n$$

For $n\ge 1$ let $\mathcal{I}_n$ denote the collection of subsets of $\{1,2,\ldots,n\}$ whose elements add up to $n$. Then

$$A_n=\sum_{I\in\mathcal{I}_n}(-1)^{|I|}\prod_{i\in I}{X_i}.$$

One can get the ghost components by taking the logarithmic derivative:

$$\begin{align}
-t\frac{d}{dt}\log f_X(t)&= -t\frac{d}{dt} \sum_{n\ge 1} \log(1-X_n t^n) \\
&=t \frac{d}{dt}\sum_{n\ge 1}\sum_{d\ge 1}\frac{X_n^d t^{nd}}{d}\\
&=\sum_{n\ge 1}\sum_{d\ge 1} n X_n^d t^{nd} \\
&=\sum_{m\ge 1}\sum_{d|m}dX_{d}^{m/d}t^m \\
&=\sum_{m\ge 1}X^{(m)}t^m
\end{align}$$

=== Sum ===
Now one can see $f_{Z}(t)=f_X(t) f_Y(t)$ if $Z=X+Y$. So that

$$C_n=\sum_{0\le i\le n}A_n B_{n-i},$$

if $A_n,B_n,C_n$ are the respective coefficients in the power series $f_X(t),f_Y(t),f_Z(t)$. Then

$$Z_n=\sum_{0\le i\le n}A_n B_{n-i}-\sum_{I\in\mathcal{I}_n,I\ne\{n\}}(-1)^{|I|}\prod_{i\in I}{Z_i}.$$

Since $A_n$ is a polynomial in $X_1, \ldots, X_n$ and likewise for $B_n$, one can show by induction that $Z_n$ is a polynomial in $X_1, \ldots, X_n, Y_1, \ldots, Y_n.$

=== Product ===
If $W=XY$ is set, then

$$-t\frac{d}{dt}\log f_W(t)=-\sum_{m\ge 1}X^{(m)}Y^{(m)}t^m$$.

but

$$\sum_{m\ge 1}X^{(m)}Y^{(m)}t^m=\sum_{m\ge 1}\sum_{d|m}d X_d^{m/d}\sum_{e|m}e Y_e^{m/e}t^m$$.

Now 3-tuples ${m,d,e}$ with $m \in \Z^+, d \,|\, m, e \,|\, m$ are in bijection with 3-tuples ${d,e,n}$ with $d,e,n \in \Z^+$, via $n = m/[d,e]$ ($[d,e]$ is the least common multiple), the series becomes

$$\sum_{d,e\ge 1}d e\sum_{n\ge 1} \bigl(X_d^{[d,e]/d} \, Y_e^{[d,e]/e} t^{[d,e]} \bigr)^n=-t\frac{d}{dt}\log\prod_{d,e\ge 1} \bigl(1-X_d^{[d,e]/d}\,Y_e^{[d,e]/e}\, t^{[d,e]} \bigr)^{de/[d,e]}$$

so that

$$f_W(t)=\prod_{d,e\ge 1} \bigl(1-X_d^{[d,e]/d}\,Y_e^{[d,e]/e}\, t^{[d,e]} \bigr)^{de/[d,e]}=\sum_{n\ge 0}D_n t^n$$,

where $D_n$ are polynomials of $X_1, \ldots, X_n, Y_1, \ldots, Y_n.$ So by similar induction,

$$f_W(t)=\prod_{n\ge 1}(1-W_n t^n),$$

then $W_n$ can be solved as polynomials of $X_1,\ldots, X_n, Y_1,\ldots, Y_n$.

== Ring schemes ==
The map taking a commutative ring $R$ to the ring of Witt vectors over $R$ (for a fixed prime $p$) is a functor from commutative rings to commutative rings, and is also representable, so it can be thought of as a ring scheme, called the Witt scheme, over $\operatorname{Spec}(\Z).$ The Witt scheme can be canonically identified with the spectrum of the ring of symmetric functions.

Similarly, the rings of truncated Witt vectors, and the rings of universal Witt vectors correspond to ring schemes, called the truncated Witt schemes and the universal Witt scheme.

Moreover, the functor taking the commutative ring $R$ to the set $R^n$ is represented by the affine space $\mathbb{A}_{\Z}^n$, and the ring structure on $R^n$ makes $\mathbb{A}_{\Z}^n$ into a ring scheme denoted $\underline{\mathcal{O}}^n$. From the construction of truncated Witt vectors, it follows that their associated ring scheme $\mathbb{W}_n$ is the scheme $\mathbb{A}_{\Z}^n$ with the unique ring structure such that the morphism $\mathbb{W}_n\to \underline{\mathcal{O}}^n$ given by the Witt polynomials is a morphism of ring schemes.

== Commutative unipotent algebraic groups ==
Over an algebraically closed field of characteristic 0, any unipotent abelian connected algebraic group is isomorphic to a product of copies of the additive group $G_a$. The analogue of this for fields of characteristic $p$ is false: the truncated Witt schemes are counterexamples. (They are made into algebraic groups by using the additive structure instead of multiplication.) However, these are essentially the only counterexamples: over an algebraically closed field of characteristic $p$, any unipotent abelian connected algebraic group is isogenous to a product of truncated Witt group schemes.

== Universal property ==
André Joyal explicated the universal property of the (p-typical) Witt vectors. The basic intuition is that the formation of Witt vectors is the universal way to deform a characteristic p ring to characteristic 0 together with a lift of its Frobenius endomorphism. To make this precise, define a $\delta$-ring $(R, \delta)$ to consist of a commutative ring $R$ together with a map of sets $\delta: R \to R$ that is a p-derivation, so that $\delta$ satisfies the relations

- $\delta(0) = \delta(1) = 0$;
- $\delta(x y) = x^p \delta(y) + y^p \delta(x) + p \delta(x) \delta(y)$;
- $\delta(x + y) = \delta(x) + \delta(y) + \frac{x^p+y^p-(x+y)^p}{p}$.

The definition is such that given a $\delta$-ring $(R, \delta)$, if one defines the map $\phi: R \to R$ by the formula $\phi(x) = x^p + p \delta(x)$, then $\phi$ is a ring homomorphism lifting Frobenius on $R/p$. Conversely, if $R$ is p-torsionfree, then this formula uniquely defines the structure of a $\delta$-ring on $R$ from that of a Frobenius lift. One may thus regard the notion of $\delta$-ring as a suitable replacement for a Frobenius lift in the non-p-torsionfree case.

The collection of $\delta$-rings and ring homomorphisms thereof respecting the $\delta$-structure assembles to a category $\mathrm{CRing}_{\delta}$. One then has a forgetful functor
$$U: \mathrm{CRing}_{\delta} \to \mathrm{CRing}$$
whose right adjoint identifies with the functor $W$ of Witt vectors. The functor $U$ creates limits and colimits and admits an explicitly describable left adjoint as a type of free functor; from this, it can be shown that $\mathrm{CRing}_{\delta}$ inherits local presentability from $\mathrm{CRing}$ so that one can construct the functor $W$ by appealing to the adjoint functor theorem.

One further has that $W$ restricts to a fully faithful functor on the full subcategory of perfect rings of characteristic p. Its image then consists of those $\delta$-rings that are perfect (in the sense that the associated map $\phi$ is an isomorphism) and whose underlying ring is p-adically complete.

== See also ==
- p-derivation
- Formal group
- Artin–Hasse exponential
- Necklace ring
