= Teichmüller character =

Special character in number theory

In number theory, the Teichmüller character $\omega$ (at a prime $p$) is a character of $(\Z/q\Z)^\times$, where $q = p$ if $p$ is odd and $q = 4$ if $p = 2$, taking values in the roots of unity of the p-adic integers. It was introduced by Oswald Teichmüller. Identifying the roots of unity in the $p$-adic integers with the corresponding ones in the complex numbers, $\omega$ can be considered as a usual Dirichlet character of conductor $q$. More generally, given a complete discrete valuation ring $O$ whose residue field $k$ is perfect of characteristic $p$, there is a unique multiplicative section $\omega:k\to O$ of the natural surjection $O\to k$. The image of an element under this map is called its Teichmüller representative. The restriction of $\omega$ to $k^\times$ is called the Teichmüller character.

== Definition ==
If $x$ is an integer mod $p$, then $\omega(x)$ is the unique solution of $\omega(x)^p = \omega(x)$ that is congruent to $x$ mod $p$. It can also be defined by

$$\omega(x)=\lim_{n\rightarrow\infty} x^{p^n}$$

The multiplicative group of $p$-adic units is a product of the finite group of roots of unity and a group isomorphic to the $p$-adic integers. The finite group is cyclic of order $p-1$ or $2$, as $p$ is odd or even, respectively, and so it is isomorphic to $(\Z/q\Z)^\times$. The Teichmüller character gives a canonical isomorphism between these two groups.

A detailed exposition of the construction of Teichmüller representatives for the $p$-adic integers, by means of Hensel lifting, is given in the article on Witt vectors, where they provide an important role in providing a ring structure.

== See also ==
- Witt vector
