= Irrationality sequence =

Quickly-growing integer sequence

In mathematics, a sequence of positive integers a_{n} is called an irrationality sequence if it has the property that for every sequence x_{n} of positive integers, the sum of the series

$$\sum_{n=1}^\infty \frac{1}{a_n x_n}$$

exists (that is, it converges) and is an irrational number. The problem of characterizing irrationality sequences was posed by Paul Erdős and Ernst G. Straus, who originally called the property of being an irrationality sequence "Property P".

== Examples ==
The powers of two whose exponents are powers of two, $2^{2^n}$, form an irrationality sequence. However, although Sylvester's sequence

2, 3, 7, 43, 1807, 3263443, ...

(in which each term is one more than the product of all previous terms) also grows doubly exponentially, it does not form an irrationality sequence. For, letting $x_n=1$ for all $n$ gives

$$\frac{1}{2}+\frac{1}{3}+\frac{1}{7}+\frac{1}{43}+\cdots = 1,$$

a series converging to a rational number. Likewise, the factorials, $n!$, do not form an irrationality sequence because the sequence given by $x_n=n+2$ for all $n$ leads to a series with a rational sum,

$\sum_{n=0}^{\infty}\frac{1}{(n+2)n!}=\frac{1}{2}+\frac{1}{3}+\frac{1}{8}+\frac{1}{30}+\frac{1}{144}+\cdots=1.$

== Growth rate ==
For any sequence a_{n} to be an irrationality sequence, it must grow at a rate such that

$\limsup_{n\to\infty} \frac{\log\log a_n}{n} \geq \log 2$.

This includes sequences that grow at a more than doubly exponential rate as well as some doubly exponential sequences that grow more quickly than the powers of powers of two.

Every irrationality sequence must grow quickly enough that

$$\lim_{n\to\infty} a_n^{1/n}=\infty.$$

However, it is not known whether there exists such a sequence in which the greatest common divisor of each pair of terms is 1 (unlike the powers of powers of two) and for which

$\lim_{n\to\infty} a_n^{1/2^n}<\infty.$

== Related properties ==
Analogously to irrationality sequences, Hančl (1996) has defined a transcendental sequence to be an integer sequence a_{n} such that, for every sequence x_{n} of positive integers, the sum of the series

$$\sum_{n=1}^\infty \frac{1}{a_n x_n}$$

exists and is a transcendental number.
