= Cahen's constant =

Sum of an infinite series, about 0.6434

In mathematics, Cahen's constant is defined as the value of the following infinite series of unit fractions with alternating signs:

$$C = \sum_{i=0}^\infty \frac{(-1)^i}{s_i-1}=\frac11 - \frac12 + \frac16 - \frac1{42} + \frac1{1806} - \cdots\approx 0.643410546288...$$

(sequence A118227 in the OEIS). Here $(s_i)_{i \geq 0}$ denotes Sylvester's sequence, which is defined recursively by $s_0=2$ and

$$s_{i+1} = 1 + \prod_{j=0}^i s_j$$

for $i \geq 0$. Combining these fractions in pairs leads to an alternative expansion of Cahen's constant as a series of positive unit fractions formed from the terms in even positions of Sylvester's sequence. This series for Cahen's constant forms its greedy Egyptian expansion:

$$C = \sum_{i=0}^\infty\frac{1}{s_{2i}}=\frac12+\frac17+\frac1{1807}+\frac1{10650056950807}+\cdots$$

Cahen's constant is named after Eugène Cahen, also known for the Cahen–Mellin integral, who was the first to introduce it and prove its irrationality.

== Continued fraction expansion ==
The majority of naturally occurring (Note: A number is said to be naturally occurring if it is not defined through its decimal or continued fraction expansion. In this sense, for example, Euler's number $e = \textstyle\lim_{n \to \infty} (1+\frac{1}{n})^n$ is naturally occurring.) mathematical constants have no known simple patterns in their continued fraction expansions. Nevertheless, the complete continued fraction expansion of Cahen's constant $C$ is known: it is

$$C = \left[a_0^2; a_1^2, a_2^2, a_3^2, a_4^2, \ldots\right] = [0;1,1,1,4,9,196,16641,\ldots]$$

where the sequence of coefficients

$$0, 1, 1, 1, 2, 3, 14, 129, 25298, 420984147, ...$$

(sequence A006279 in the OEIS) is defined for all $n\geq 0$ by the recurrence relation

$$a_0 = 0,\;\;a_1 = 1,\;\;a_{n+2} = a_n(1 + a_n a_{n+1}).$$

All the partial quotients of this expansion are squares of integers. Davison and Shallit made use of the continued fraction expansion to prove that $C$ is transcendental.

Alternatively, one may express the partial quotients in the continued fraction expansion of Cahen's constant through the terms of Sylvester's sequence. To see this, we prove by induction that $1+a_n a_{n+1} = s_{n-1}$. Indeed, we have $1+a_1 a_2 = 2 = s_0$, and if $1+a_n a_{n+1} = s_{n-1}$ holds for some $n \geq 1$, then

$$\begin{aligned}
1+a_{n+1}a_{n+2} &= 1+a_{n+1} \cdot a_n(1+a_n a_{n+1}) \\[4pt] &= 1+a_n a_{n+1} + (a_na_{n+1})^2 \\[4pt] &= s_{n-1} + (s_{n-1}-1)^2 \\[4pt] &= s_{n-1}^2-s_{n-1}+1 = s_n.
\end{aligned}$$

As a consequence, $a_{n+2} = a_n \cdot s_{n-1}$ holds for every $n \geq 1$, from which it is easy to conclude that

$$C = [0;1,1,1,s_0^2, s_1^2, (s_0s_2)^2, (s_1s_3)^2, (s_0s_2s_4)^2,\ldots]$$.

== Best approximation order ==
Cahen's constant $C$ has best approximation order $q^{-3}$; that is, there exist constants $K_1, K_2 > 0$ such that the inequality

$$0 < \bigg|C - \frac{p}{q}\bigg| < \frac{K_1}{q^3}$$

has infinitely many solutions $(p,q) \in \Z \times \N$, while the inequality

$$0 < \bigg|C - \frac{p}{q}\bigg| < \frac{K_2}{q^3}$$

has at most finitely many solutions $(p,q) \in \mathbb{Z} \times \mathbb{N}$. This implies that $C$ has irrationality measure 3.

To give a proof, denote by $(p_n/q_n)_{n \geq 0}$ the sequence of convergents to Cahen's constant (i.e., $q_{n-1} = a_n$ for every $n \geq 1$). It follows from $a_{n+2} = a_n \cdot s_{n-1}$and the recursion for $(s_n)_{n \geq 0}$ that

$$\frac{a_{n+2}}{a_{n+1}^2} = \frac{a_{n} \cdot s_{n-1}}{a_{n-1}^2 \cdot s_{n-2}^2} = \frac{a_n}{a_{n-1}^2} \cdot \frac{s_{n-2}^2 - s_{n-2} + 1}{s_{n-1}^2} = \frac{a_n}{a_{n-1}^2} \cdot \Big( 1 - \frac{1}{s_{n-1}} + \frac{1}{s_{n-1}^2} \Big)$$

for every $n \geq 1$. As a consequence, the limits

$$\alpha := \lim_{n \to \infty} \frac{q_{2n+1}}{q_{2n}^2} = \prod_{n=0}^\infty \Big( 1 - \frac{1}{s_{2n}} + \frac{1}{s_{2n}^2}\Big)$$

and

$$\beta := \lim_{n \to \infty} \frac{q_{2n+2}}{q_{2n+1}^2} = 2 \cdot \prod_{n=0}^\infty \Big( 1 - \frac{1}{s_{2n+1}} + \frac{1}{s_{2n+1}^2}\Big)$$

both exist by basic properties of infinite products, which is due to the absolute convergence of

$$\sum_{n=0}^\infty \Big| \frac{1}{s_{n}} - \frac{1}{s_{n}^2} \Big|$$.

Numerically, one can check that $0 < \alpha < 1 < \beta < 2$. Thus, the inequality

$$\frac{1}{q_n(q_n + q_{n+1})} \leq \Big| C - \frac{p_n}{q_n} \Big| \leq \frac{1}{q_nq_{n+1}}$$

yields

$$\Big| C - \frac{p_{2n+1}}{q_{2n+1}} \Big| \leq \frac{1}{q_{2n+1}q_{2n+2}} = \frac{1}{q_{2n+1}^3 \cdot
\frac{q_{2n+2}}{q_{2n+1}^2}} < \frac{1}{q_{2n+1}^3}$$

and

$$\Big| C - \frac{p_n}{q_n} \Big| \geq \frac{1}{q_n(q_n + q_{n+1})} > \frac{1}{q_n(q_n + 2q_{n}^2)} \geq \frac{1}{3q_n^3}$$

for all sufficiently large $n$. Therefore, $C$ has best approximation order 3 (with $K_1 = 1 \text{ and } K_2 = 1/3$), where we use that any solution $(p,q) \in \mathbb{Z} \times \mathbb{N}$ to

$$0 < \Big| C - \frac{p}{q} \Big| < \frac{1}{3q^3}$$

is necessarily a convergent to Cahen's constant.
