= Znám's problem =

On divisibility among sets of integers

Graphical demonstration that 1 = 1/2 + 1/3 + 1/11 + 1/23 + 1/31 + 1/(2×3×11×23×31). Each row of k squares of side length 1/k has total area 1/k, and all the squares together exactly cover a larger square with area 1. The bottom row of 47058 squares with side length 1/47058 is too small to see in the figure and is not shown.

In number theory, Znám's problem asks which sets of integers have the property that each integer in the set is a proper divisor of the product of the other integers in the set, plus 1. Znám's problem is named after the Slovak mathematician Štefan Znám, who suggested it in 1972, although other mathematicians had considered similar problems around the same time.

The initial terms of Sylvester's sequence almost solve this problem, except that the last chosen term equals one plus the product of the others, rather than being a proper divisor. Sun in 1983 showed that there is at least one solution to the (proper) Znám problem for each $k\ge 5$. Sun's solution is based on a recurrence similar to that for Sylvester's sequence, but with a different set of initial values.

The Znám problem is closely related to Egyptian fractions. It is known that there are only finitely many solutions for any fixed $k$. It is unknown whether there are any solutions to Znám's problem using only odd numbers, and there remain several other open questions.

== The problem ==
Znám's problem asks which sets of integers have the property that each integer in the set is a proper divisor of the product of the other integers in the set, plus 1. That is, given $k$, what sets of integers
$$\{n_1, \ldots, n_k\}$$
are there such that, for each $i$, $n_i$ divides but is not equal to
$$\Bigl(\prod_{j \ne i}^n n_j\Bigr) + 1 ?$$
A closely related problem concerns sets of integers in which each integer in the set is a divisor, but not necessarily a proper divisor, of one plus the product of the other integers in the set. This problem does not seem to have been named in the literature, and is referred to here as the improper Znám problem. Any solution to Znám's problem is also a solution to the improper Znám problem, but not necessarily vice versa.

== Origin ==
Znám's problem is named after the Slovak mathematician Štefan Znám, who suggested it in 1972. Earlier, in 1971, Barbeau had posed the improper Znám problem for $k=3$, and soon afterward Mordell, independently of Znám, found all solutions to the improper problem for $k\le 5$. Then, in 1975, Skula showed that Znám's problem is unsolvable for $k<5$, and credited J. Janák with finding the solution $\{2, 3, 11, 23, 31\}$ for $k=5$.

== Examples ==
Sylvester's sequence is an integer sequence in which each term is one plus the product of the previous terms. The first few terms of the sequence are

2, 3, 7, 43, 1807, 3263443, 10650056950807, 113423713055421844361000443 (sequence A000058 in the OEIS).

Stopping the sequence early produces a set like $\{2, 3, 7, 43\}$ that almost meets the conditions of Znám's problem, except that the largest value equals one plus the product of the other terms, rather than being a proper divisor. Thus, it is a solution to the improper Znám problem, but not a solution to Znám's problem as it is usually defined.

One solution to the proper Znám problem, for $k=5$, is $\{2, 3, 7, 47, 395\}$. A few calculations will show that

3 × 7 × 47 × 395	+ 1 =	389866,	which is divisible by but unequal to 2,
2 × 7 × 47 × 395	+ 1 =	259911,	which is divisible by but unequal to 3,
2 × 3 × 47 × 395	+ 1 =	111391,	which is divisible by but unequal to 7,
2 × 3 × 7 × 395	+ 1 =	16591,	which is divisible by but unequal to 47, and
2 × 3 × 7 × 47	+ 1 =	1975,	which is divisible by but unequal to 395.

== Connection to Egyptian fractions ==
Any solution to the improper Znám problem is equivalent (via division by the product of the values $x_i$) to a solution to the equation
$$\sum\frac1{x_i} + \prod\frac1{x_i}=y,$$
where $y$ as well as each $x_i$ must be an integer, and conversely any such solution corresponds to a solution to the improper Znám problem. However, all known solutions have $y=1$, so they satisfy the equation
$$\sum\frac1{x_i} + \prod\frac1{x_i}=1.$$
This equation describes an Egyptian fraction representation of the number one as a sum of unit fractions. The solutions to this equation have been applied to the classification of singularities on surfaces, and to the theory of nondeterministic finite automata.

== Number of solutions ==
The number of solutions to Znám's problem for any $k$ is finite, so it makes sense to count the total number of solutions for each $k$. Sun showed in 1983 that there is at least one solution to the (proper) Znám problem for each $k\ge 5$. Sun's solution is based on a recurrence similar to that for Sylvester's sequence, but with a different set of initial values. The number of solutions for small values of $k$, starting with $k=5$, forms the sequence:

2, 5, 18, 96 (sequence A075441 in the OEIS).

Presently, a few solutions are known for $k=9$ and $k=10$, but it is unclear how many solutions remain undiscovered for those values of $k$. However, there are infinitely many solutions if $k$ is not fixed: Cao and Jing showed in 1998 showed that there are at least 39 solutions for each $k\ge 12$, improving earlier results proving the existence of fewer solutions; Sun and Cao conjectured in 1988 that the number of solutions for each value of $k$ grows monotonically with $k$.

It is unknown whether there are any solutions to Znám's problem using only odd numbers. With one exception, all known solutions start with 2. If all numbers in a solution to Znám's problem or the improper Znám problem are prime, their product is a primary pseudoperfect number.

== See also ==
- Giuga number
