= Primary pseudoperfect number =

Type of number

Graphical demonstration that 1 = 1/2 + 1/3 + 1/11 + 1/23 + 1/31 + 1/(2×3×11×23×31). Therefore the product, 47058, is primary pseudoperfect.

In mathematics, and particularly in number theory, N is a primary pseudoperfect number if it satisfies the Egyptian fraction equation

$$\frac{1}{N} + \sum_{p \,|\;\! N}\frac{1}{p} = 1,$$

where the sum is over only the prime divisors of N.

== Properties ==
Equivalently, N is a primary pseudoperfect number if it satisfies

$$1 + \sum_{p \,|\;\! N} \frac{N}{p} = N.$$

Except for the primary pseudoperfect number N = 2, this expression gives a representation for N as the sum of distinct divisors of N. Therefore, each primary pseudoperfect number N (except N = 2) is also pseudoperfect.

The ten known primary pseudoperfect numbers are

2, 6, 42, 1806, 47058, 2214502422, 52495396602, 5998279018951962402, 8490421583559688410706771261086, 35979351189199316534587473905773572006 (sequence A054377 in the OEIS).

The first four of these numbers are one less than the corresponding numbers in Sylvester's sequence, but then the two sequences diverge. The two largest known primary pseudoperfect numbers may be out of order.

It is unknown whether there are infinitely many primary pseudoperfect numbers, or whether there are any odd primary pseudoperfect numbers.

The prime factors of primary pseudoperfect numbers sometimes may provide solutions to Znám's problem, in which all elements of the solution set are prime. For instance, the prime factors of the primary pseudoperfect number 47058 form the solution set {2,3,11,23,31} to Znám's problem. However, the smaller primary pseudoperfect numbers 2, 6, 42, and 1806 do not correspond to solutions to Znám's problem in this way, as their sets of prime factors violate the requirement that no number in the set can equal one plus the product of the other numbers. Anne (1998) observes that there is exactly one solution set of this type that has k primes in it, for each k ≤ 8, and conjectures that the same is true for larger k.

If a primary pseudoperfect number N is one less than a prime number, then N × (N + 1) is also primary pseudoperfect. For instance, 47058 is primary pseudoperfect, and 47059 is prime, so 47058 × 47059 = 2214502422 is also primary pseudoperfect.

== History ==
Primary pseudoperfect numbers were first investigated and named by Butske, Jaje & Mayernik (2000). Using computational search techniques, they proved the remarkable result that for each positive integer r up to 8, there exists exactly one primary pseudoperfect number with precisely r (distinct) prime factors, namely, the rth known primary pseudoperfect number. Those with 2 ≤ r ≤ 8, when reduced modulo 288, form the arithmetic progression 6, 42, 78, 114, 150, 186, 222, as was observed by Sondow & MacMillan (2017). The ninth known primary pseudoperfect number was discovered by Wang (2026) and Martins, Pedro (2026). Martins, Pedro (2026) also reported an additional primary pseudoperfect number, 2318487344461212044808266715505249967391337588451045543300838, bringing the number of known examples to eleven. It is the second known primary pseudoperfect number with ten distinct prime factors.

== See also ==
- Giuga number
