= List of multiple discoveries =

Historians and sociologists have remarked the occurrence in science of "multiple independent discovery". Robert K. Merton defined such "multiples" as instances in which similar discoveries are made by scientists working independently of each other. "Sometimes", writes Merton, "the discoveries are simultaneous or almost so; sometimes a scientist will make a new discovery which, unknown to him, somebody else has made years before."

Commonly cited examples of multiple independent discoveries are the independent formulation of calculus by Isaac Newton and Gottfried Wilhelm Leibniz in the 17th century; the independent discovery of oxygen by Carl Wilhelm Scheele, Joseph Priestley, Antoine Lavoisier and others in the 18th century; and the theory of the evolution of species by natural selection, which was independently proposed by Charles Darwin and Alfred Russel Wallace in the 19th century.

Multiple independent discovery, however, is not limited to such famous historic instances. Merton believed that multiple discoveries in science are more commonly the rule rather than the exception: the discovery or elucidation of novel ideas or technologies by multiple people working independently represents a "common" pattern in science, while unique discoveries, on the contrary, are relatively rare. Merton contrasted a "multiple" with a "singleton"—a discovery that has been made uniquely by a single scientist or group of scientists working together. Others have observed that this distinction may blur as science becomes increasingly collaborative.

A distinction is sometimes drawn between a discovery and an invention, as discussed for example by Bolesław Prus. However, discoveries and inventions are inextricably related, in that discoveries lead to inventions, and inventions facilitate discoveries; and since the same phenomenon of multiplicity occurs in relation to both discoveries and inventions, this article lists both multiple discoveries and multiple inventions.

== 3rd century BCE ==
- Aristarchus of Samos (c. 310 – c. 230 BCE) was the first known originator of a heliocentric (solar) system. Such a system was formulated again some 18 centuries later by Nicolaus Copernicus (1473–1543).

== 13th century CE ==
- 1242: Arab polymath Ibn al-Nafis was the first to describe the function of pulmonary circulation. This aspect of the vertebrate circulatory system was independently rediscovered by Michael Servetus in 1553 and by William Harvey in 1616.

== 14th century ==
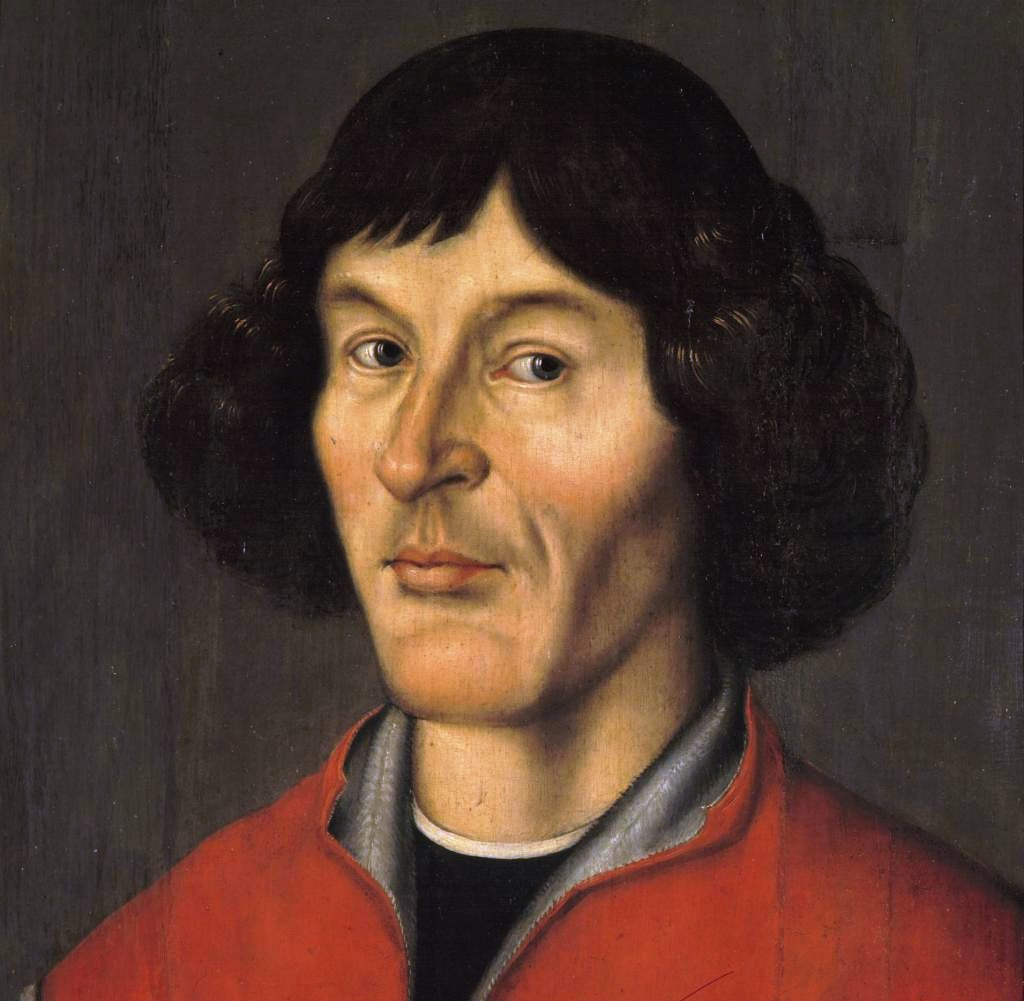
Copernicus

- Gresham's (Copernicus') law was proposed by French philosopher Nicole Oresme c. 1370, and independently by Polish polymath Nicolaus Copernicus in 1519, English merchant Thomas Gresham in the 16th century, and Scottish economist Henry Dunning Macleod in 1857. Ancient references to the same concept include one in Aristophanes' comedy The Frogs (405 BCE), which compares bad politicians to bad coin (bad politicians and bad coin, respectively, drive good politicians and good coin out of circulation).

== 16th century ==
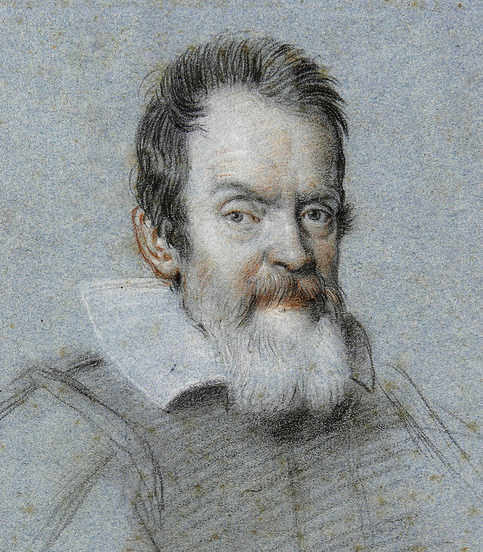
Galileo

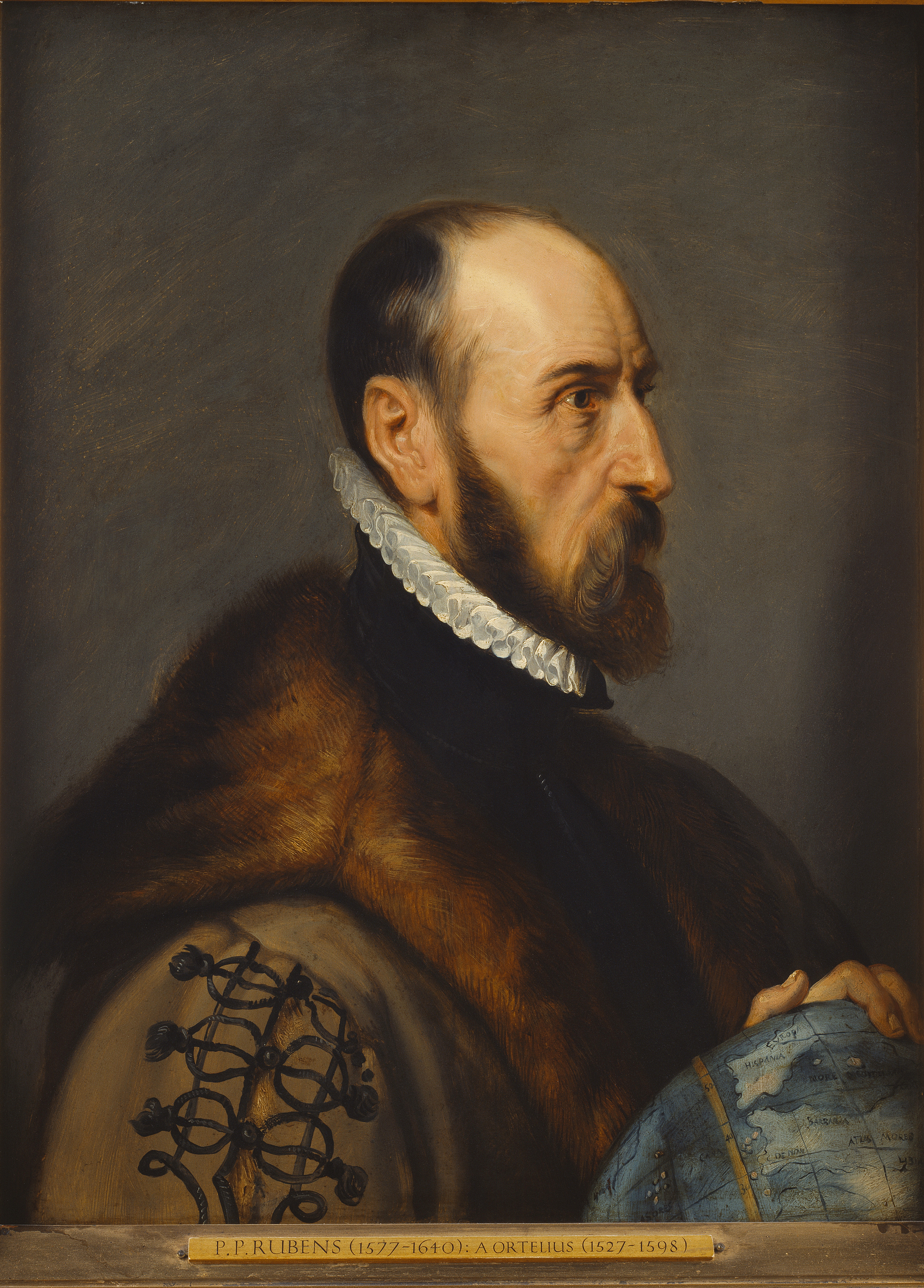
Ortelius

- Simon Stevin and Galileo Galilei each independently described the hydrostatic paradox, Stevin c. 1585 and Galileo c. 1610. They also both performed an experiment comparing heavy and light balls falling together (contra Aristotle).
- Scipione dal Ferro in 1520 and Niccolò Tartaglia in 1535 independently developed a method for solving cubic equations.
- Olbers' paradox (the "dark-night-sky paradox") was independently described by Thomas Digges in the 16th century, by Johannes Kepler in 1610, by Edmond Halley and by Jean-Philippe de Chéseaux in the 18th century, by Heinrich Wilhelm Matthias Olbers in 1823, and definitively by Lord Kelvin in 1901. Some aspects of Kelvin's argument had been anticipated in the poet and short story writer Edgar Allan Poe's essay Eureka: A Prose Poem (1848), which also presaged by three-quarters of a century the Big Bang theory of the universe.
- Continental drift, in varying independent iterations, was proposed by Abraham Ortelius in (Ortelius 1596), Theodor Christoph Lilienthal in 1756, Alexander von Humboldt in 1801 and again in 1845, Antonio Snider-Pellegrini in (Snider-Pellegrini 1858), Alfred Russel Wallace, Charles Lyell, Franklin Coxworthy between 1848 and 1890, Roberto Mantovani between 1889 and 1909, William Henry Pickering in 1907, Frank Bursley Taylor in 1908, and Alfred Wegener in 1912. In addition, in 1885 Eduard Suess proposed the former existence of a supercontinent named Gondwana and in 1893 the Tethys Ocean, assuming a land-bridge between the present continents submerged in the form of a geosyncline. In 1895 John Perry proposed that the Earth's interior was fluid and notably disagreed with Lord Kelvin on the age of the Earth.

== 17th century ==
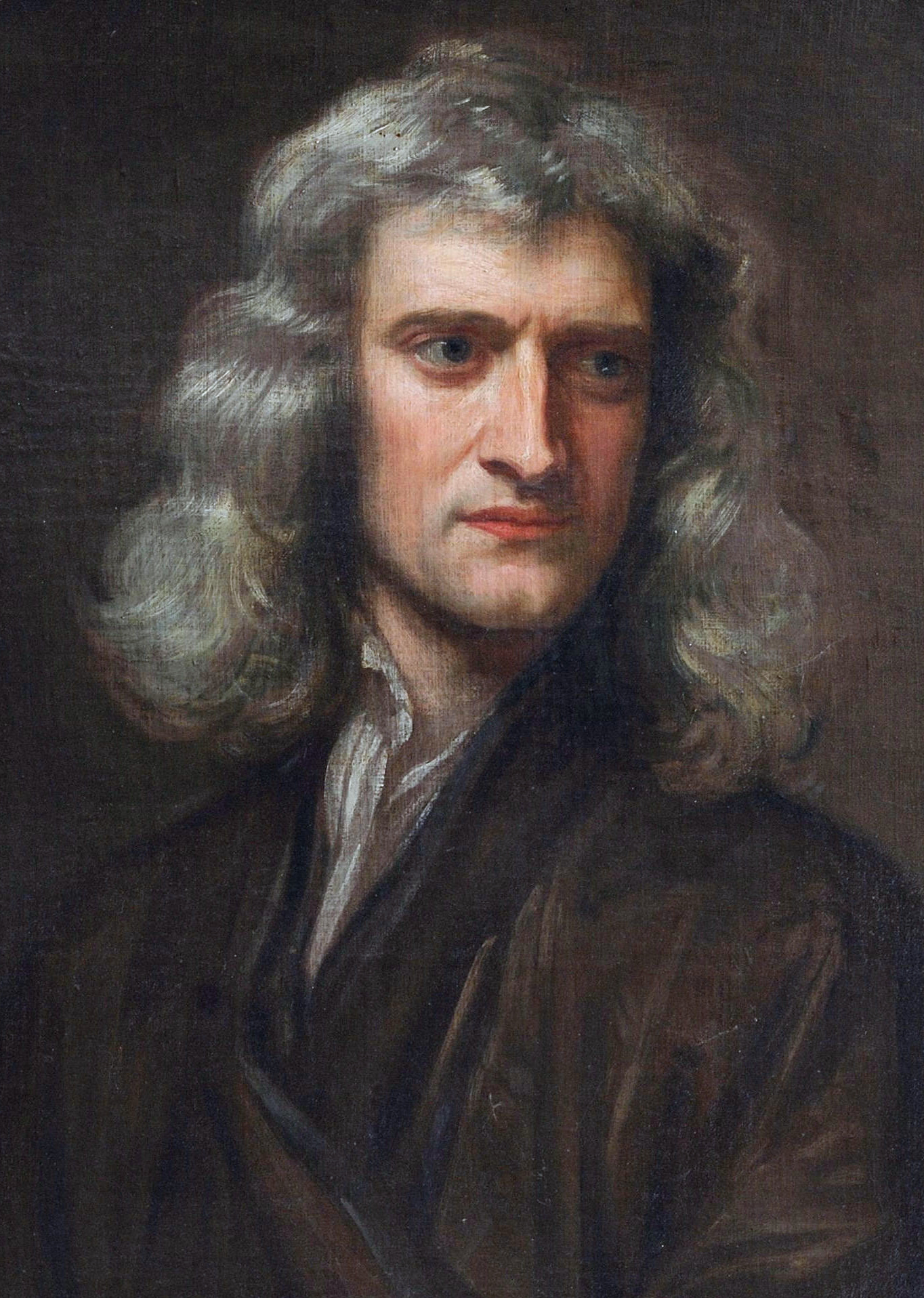
Newton

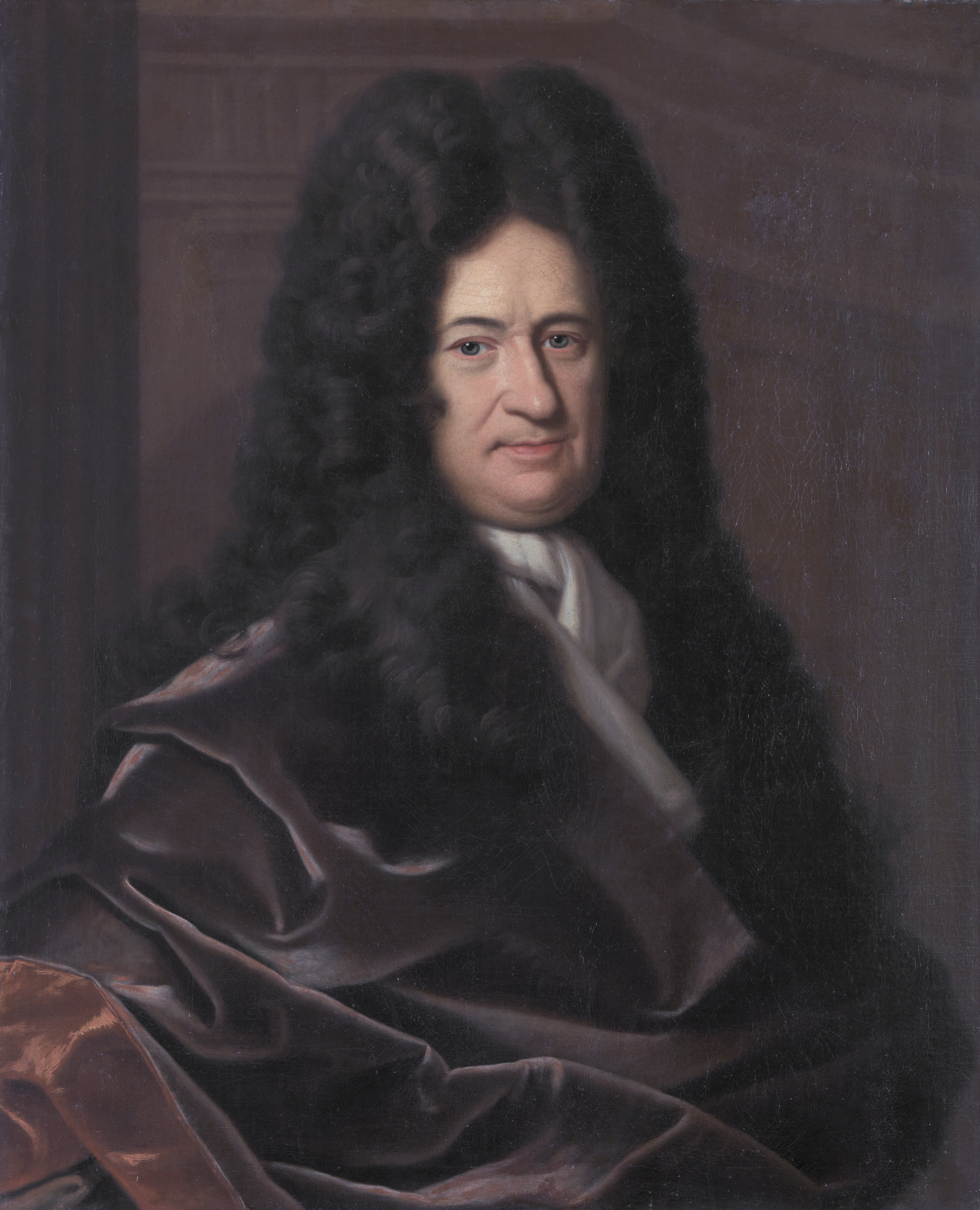
Leibniz

- Oxygen was first described by Michael Sendivogius in 1604. It was later independently described by Carl Wilhelm Scheele in 1771–1772, by Joseph Priestley in 1774, and, as a chemical element, by Antoine Lavoisier in 1777.
- Sunspots were first observed by Thomas Harriot in 1610, and later by Johannes and David Fabricius in 1611, Galileo Galilei in 1612, and Christoph Scheiner in 1612.
- Logarithms were first described by John Napier in 1614 and subsequently by Joost Bürgi in 1618.
- Analytic geometry was independently described by René Descartes and Pierre de Fermat.
- The problem of points was solved independently by both Pierre de Fermat and Blaise Pascal in 1654, and by Christiaan Huygens in 1657.
- Calculus was independently formulated by Isaac Newton and Gottfried Wilhelm Leibniz.
- Boyle's law (sometimes referred to as the "Boyle-Mariotte law") was first formulated by Anglo-Irish chemist Robert Boyle, who published the original law in 1662. The French physicist Edme Mariotte discovered the same law independently of Boyle in 1676.
- The Newton–Raphson method of finding roots in mathematics was originally described by Isaac Newton, whose work was written in 1669 and 1671 but not published until 1736. The same algorithm was independently described by Joseph Raphson in 1690.
- Determinants were described by Seki Takakazu in Japan in 1683 or earlier, and by Gottfried Wilhelm Leibniz in Germany in 1693.
- The brachistochrone problem was solved independently by Johann Bernoulli, Jakob Bernoulli, Isaac Newton, Gottfried Wilhelm Leibniz, Guillaume de l'Hôpital, and Ehrenfried Walther von Tschirnhaus. The problem was posed in 1696 by Johann Bernoulli and its solutions were published the next year.
- A patent for the steam engine was granted to Thomas Savery in 1698, though the invention has often been credited to Thomas Newcomen, who built the first practical device that harnessed steam to perform mechanical work, the atmospheric engine, in 1712. Other designers and inventors of early steam-powered devices have included Taqī al-Dīn in 1551, Jerónimo de Ayanz y Beaumont in 1606, Giambattista della Porta, Giovanni Branca in 1629, Cosimo de' Medici in 1641, Evangelista Torricelli in 1643, Otto Von Guericke in 1672, Denis Papin in 1679, and many others.

== 18th century ==
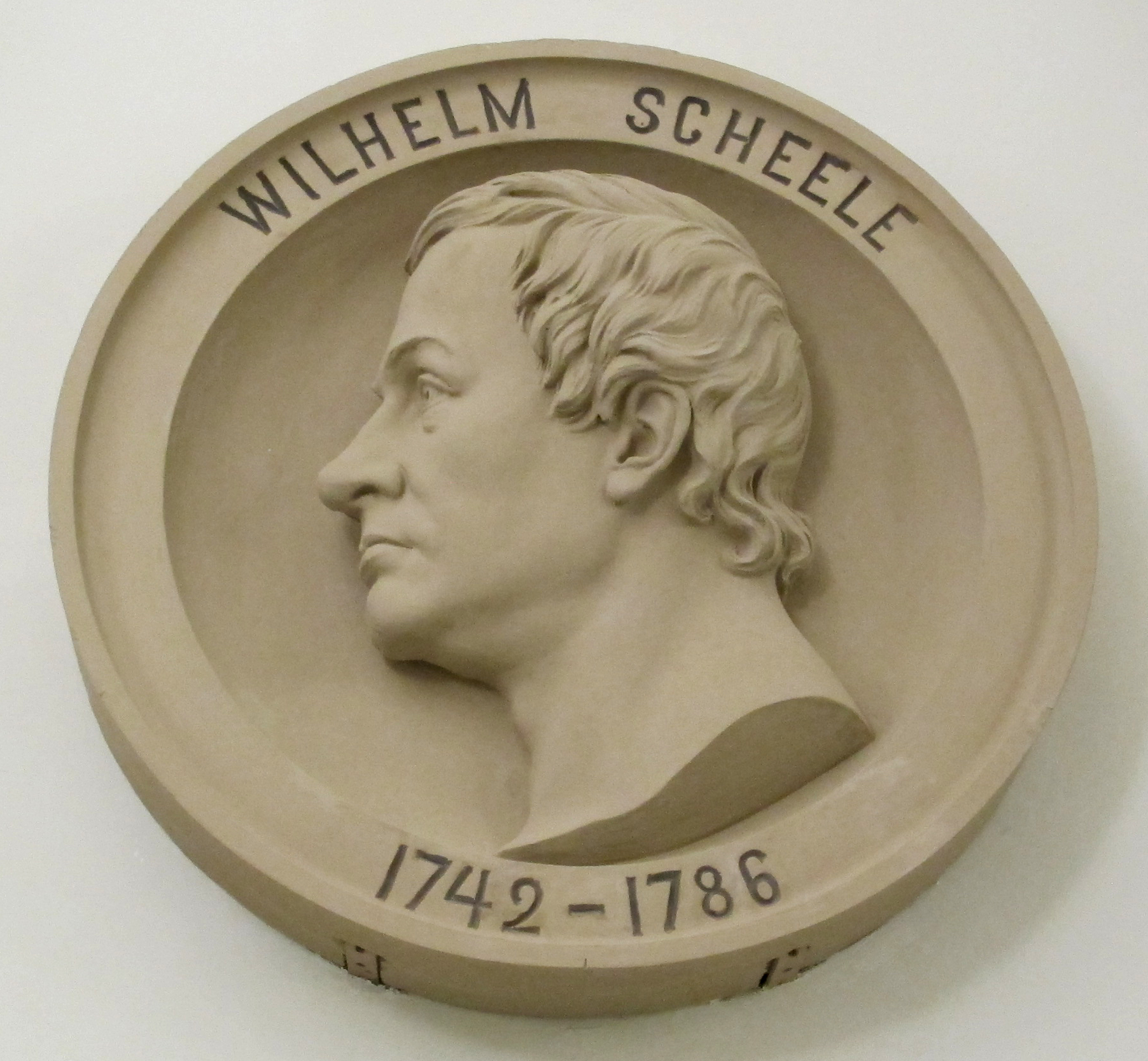
Scheele

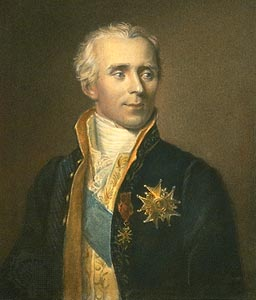
Laplace

- Stirling numbers were discovered by James Stirling in 1730 and independently by Masanobu Saka in 1782.
- Platinum was identified by both Antonio de Ulloa and Charles Wood in the 1740s.
- The Leyden jar was invented independently by Ewald Georg von Kleist in 1745 and Pieter van Musschenbroek in 1745–1746.
- The lightning rod was invented by Benjamin Franklin in 1749 and by Prokop Diviš in 1754, though this has been debated: Diviš's apparatus is assumed to have been more effective than Franklin's lightning rod but was intended for a different purpose than lightning protection.
- The law of conservation of matter was independently formulated by Mikhail Lomonosov in 1756 and by Antoine Lavoisier in 1778.
- Black-hole theory was anticipated by John Michell in a 1783 paper in The Philosophical Transactions of the Royal Society when he wrote: "If the semi-diameter of a sphere of the same density as the Sun in the proportion of five hundred to one, and by supposing light to be attracted by the same force in proportion to its [mass] with other bodies, all light emitted from such a body would be made to return towards it, by its own proper gravity." A few years later, a similar idea was suggested independently by Pierre-Simon Laplace.
- The concept of the Malthusian catastrophe was proposed by Thomas Robert Malthus in 1798 and independently by Hong Liangji in 1793.
- Methods for measuring the specific heat of a solid were devised independently by Benjamin Thompson, Count Rumford and by Johan Wilcke, who published his discovery first (apparently not later than 1796, when he died).
- The geometrical representation of complex numbers in the complex plane was discovered independently by Caspar Wessel in 1799, Jean-Robert Argand in 1806, John Warren in 1828, and Carl Friedrich Gauss in 1831.

== 19th century ==
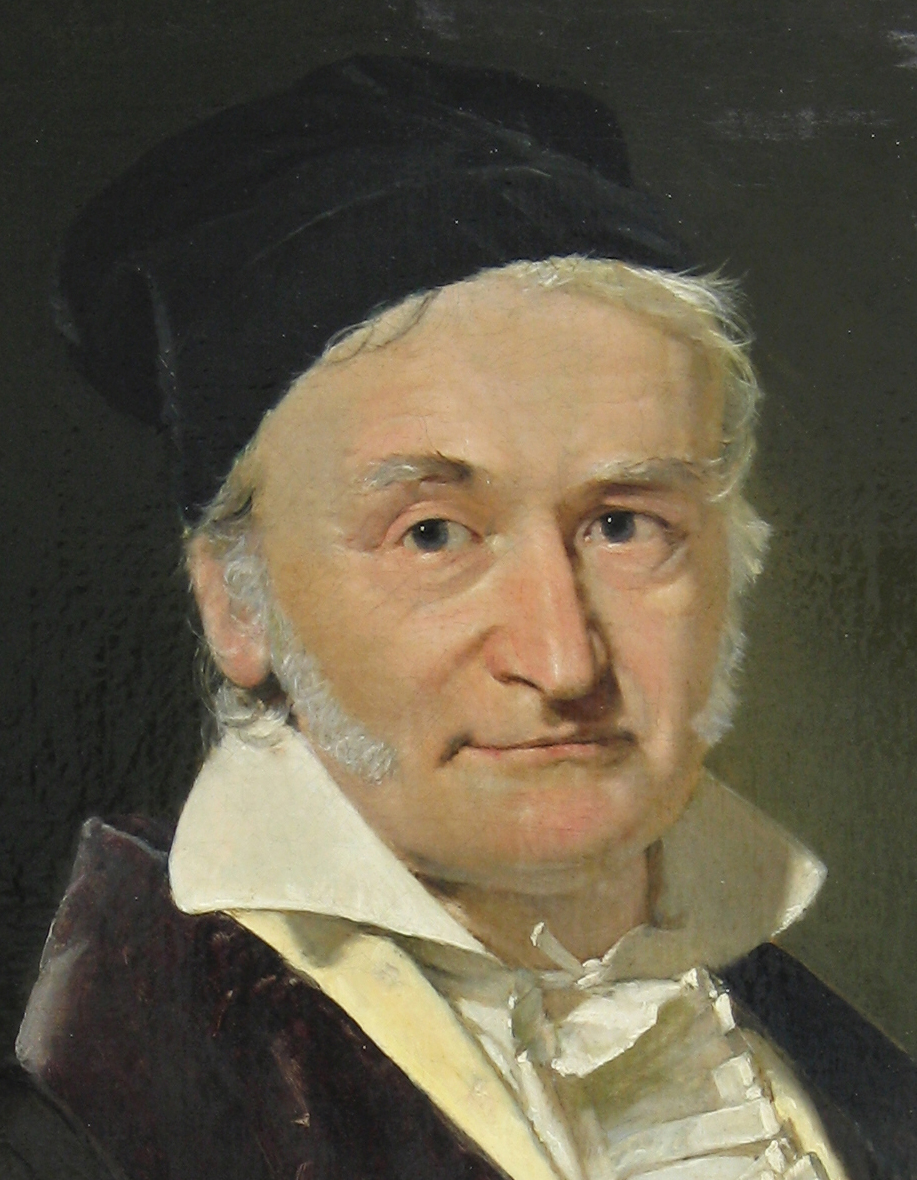
Gauss

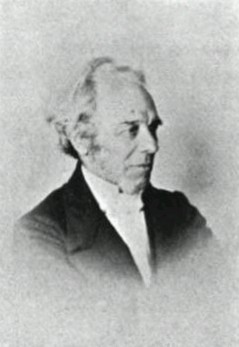
Faraday

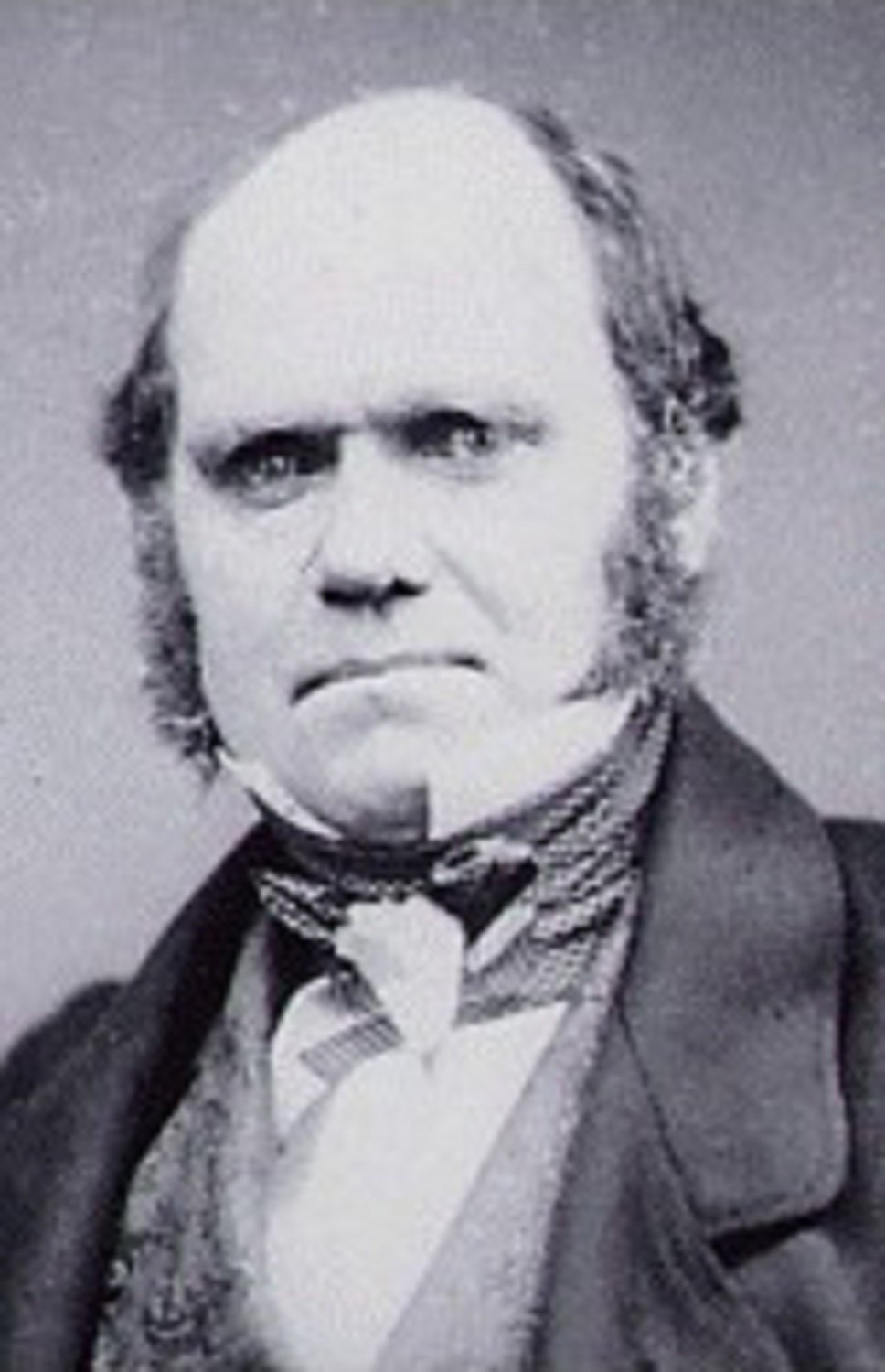
Darwin

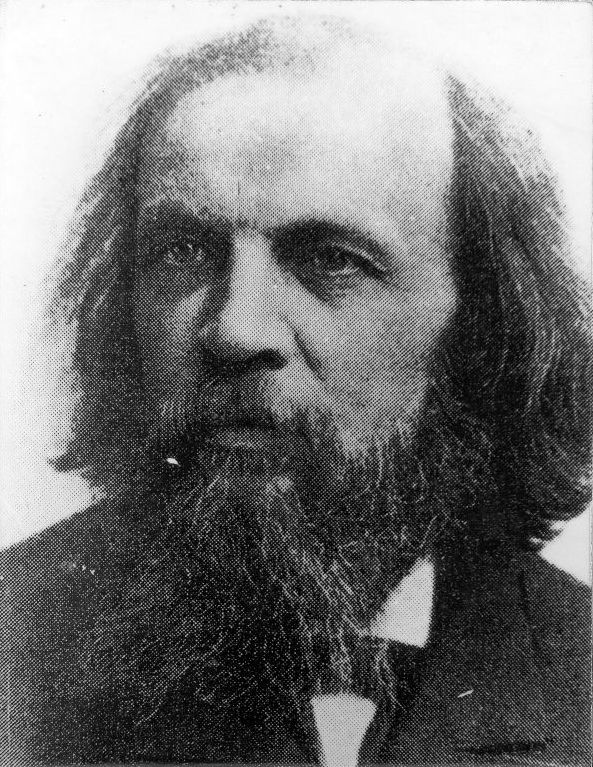
Mendeleyev

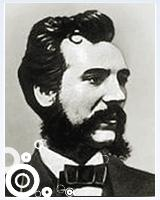
Bell

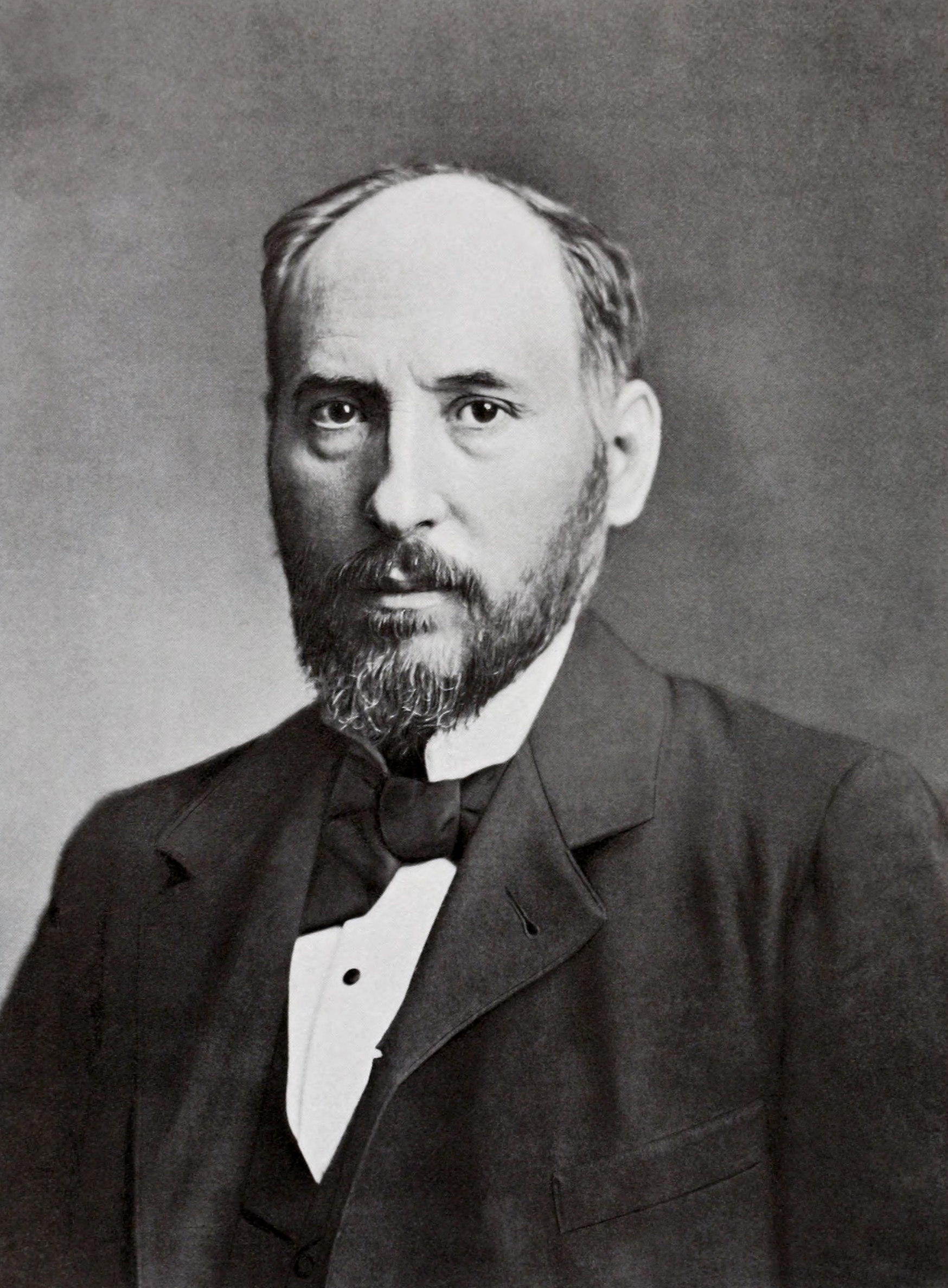
Ramón y Cajal

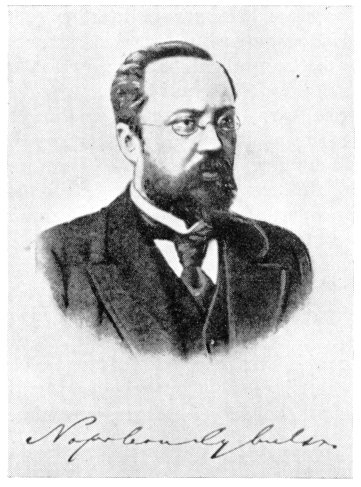
Cybulski

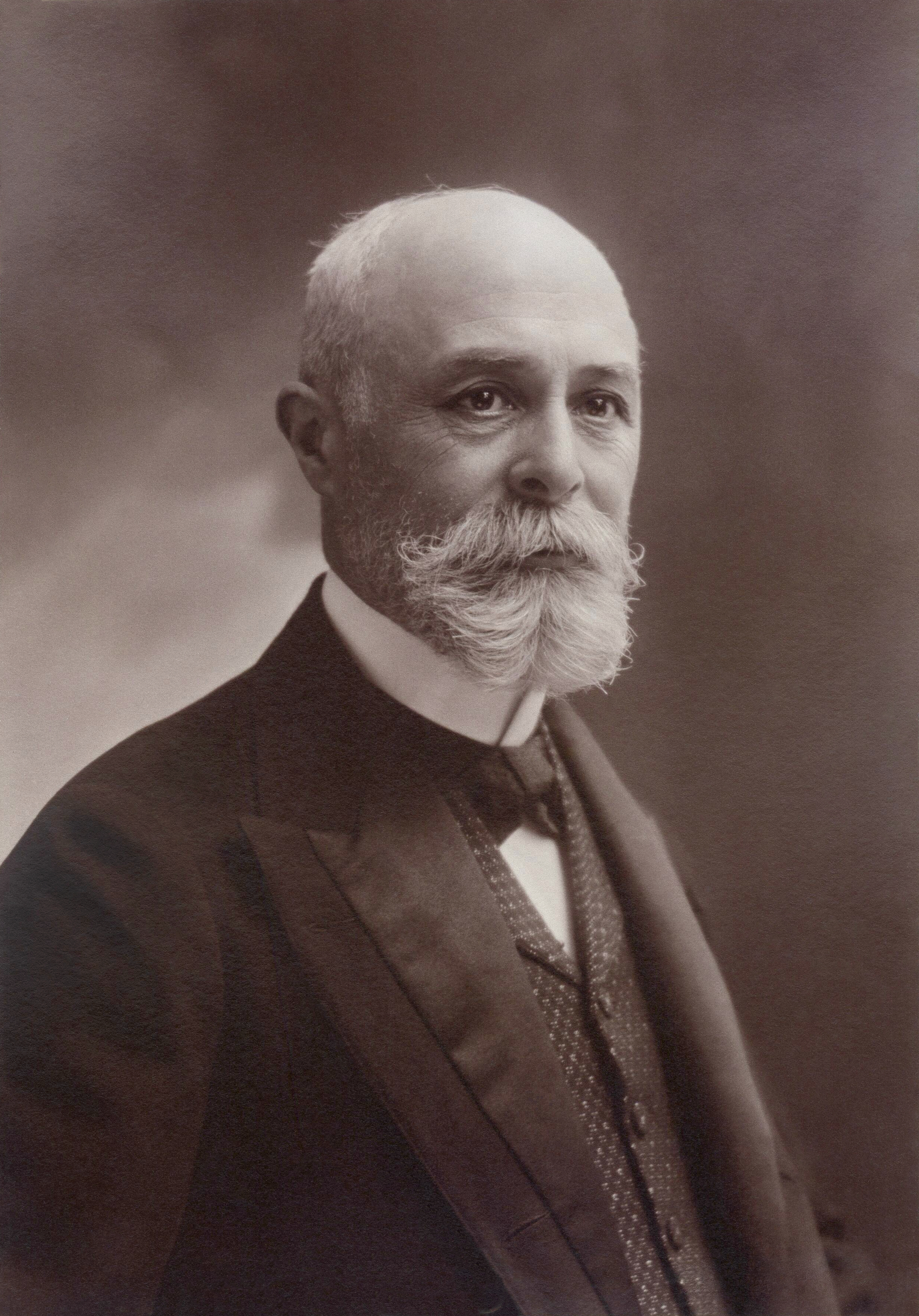
Becquerel

- In a treatise written in 1805 but not published until 1866, Carl Friedrich Gauss described an efficient algorithm to compute the discrete Fourier transform. James W. Cooley and John W. Tukey reinvented a similar algorithm in 1965.
- Cadmium was discovered independently by both Friedrich Strohmeyer and K. S. L. Hermann in 1817.
- The Grotthuss–Draper law (the principle of photochemical activation) was first proposed in 1817 by Theodor Grotthuss, and independently in 1842 by John William Draper. The law states that only that light which is absorbed by a system can bring about a photochemical change.
- Bromine was discovered by Carl Jacob Löwig in 1825 and independently by Antoine Jérôme Balard in 1826.
- Beryllium was discovered independently by both Friedrich Wöhler and A. A. B. Bussy in 1828.
- Non-Euclidean geometry (hyperbolic geometry) was described by Nikolai Ivanovich Lobachevsky in 1830 and János Bolyai in 1832, though both were preceded by Johann Carl Friedrich Gauss in unpublished results dating to c. 1805.
- Electromagnetic induction was discovered by Michael Faraday in England in 1831, and independently about the same time by Joseph Henry in the United States.
- Chloroform was discovered by Samuel Guthrie in the United States in July 1831, and a few months later by Eugène Soubeiran in France and by Justus von Liebig in Germany, all of them using variations of the haloform reaction.
- The Dandelin–Gräffe method, also known as the Lobachevsky method, an algorithm for finding multiple roots of a polynomial, was developed independently by Germinal Pierre Dandelin, Karl Heinrich Gräffe, and Nikolai Ivanovich Lobachevsky.
- The electrical telegraph was invented independently by both Charles Wheatstone in England and Samuel F. B. Morse in the United States in 1837.
- The first law of thermodynamics was formulated independently by various scientists in the late 19th century, all of whom stated that energy and matter are persistent (although this was later to be disregarded under subatomic conditions). Germain Hess (Hess's law), Julius Robert von Mayer, and James Joule were some of the first.
- Urbain Le Verrier and John Couch Adams, studying Uranus's orbit, each independently proved in 1846 that another, farther planet must exist. Neptune was found at the predicted moment and position. (Note: Priyamvada Natarajan notes that, while Le Verrier and Adams "shared credit for the discovery [of Neptune] until fairly recently ... historians of science [have] revealed that while Adams did perform some interesting calculations, his were not as precise or as accurate as Le Verrier's, and, moreover, he had not published his work, while Le Verrier had shared his predictions." Le Verrier "presented the calculated position of th[e] unseen planet [Neptune] to the French Academy of Sciences in Paris on August 31, 1846, barely two days before Adams mailed his own solution to the astronomer royal, George Airy, at the Greenwich Observatory so that his calculations could be checked. Neither Adams nor Le Verrier knew that the other had been researching Uranus's orbit." Natarajan also notes that, "Though Neptune wasn't properly identified until 1846, it had been observed much earlier.": by Galileo Galilei (1612, 1613); by Michel Lalande (8 and 10 May 1795), nephew and pupil of French astronomer Joseph-Jérôme Lalande; by Scottish astronomer John Lambert, while working at the Munich Observatory in 1845 and 1846; and by James Challis (4 and 12 August 1846).)
- The Bessemer process of removing impurities from steel on an industrial level using oxidation was developed in 1851 by American inventor William Kelly and independently developed and patented in 1855 by English inventor Sir Henry Bessemer.
- The Möbius strip was discovered independently by German astronomer–mathematician August Ferdinand Möbius and German mathematician Johann Benedict Listing in 1858.
- The theory of evolution by natural selection was first described by Charles Darwin (conceptualized about 1840) and Alfred Russel Wallace (conceptualized about 1857–1858) in papers published concurrently in 1858.
- 109P/Swift–Tuttle, the comet generating the Perseid meteor shower, was independently discovered by Lewis Swift on 16 July 1862, and by Horace Parnell Tuttle on 19 July 1862. The comet made a return appearance in 1992, when it was rediscovered by Japanese astronomer Tsuruhiko Kiuchi.
- In 1868, French astronomer Pierre Janssen and English astronomer Norman Lockyer independently discovered evidence in the solar spectrum for a new element that Lockyer named "helium". The formal discovery of the element was made in 1895 by two Swedish chemists, Per Teodor Cleve and Nils Abraham Langlet, who found helium emanating from the uranium ore cleveite.
- Dmitri Ivanovich Mendeleyev published his periodic table of the chemical elements in 1869, and the following year (1870) Julius Lothar Meyer published his own independently constructed version.
- Bolesław Prus propounded a "law of combination" in 1873 describing the making of discoveries and inventions: "Any new discovery or invention is a combination of earlier discoveries and inventions, or rests on them." In 1978, Christopher Kasparek independently proposed an identical model of discovery and invention which he termed "recombinant conceptualization".
- In 1876, Oskar Hertwig and Hermann Fol independently described the process of fertilization or syngamy, the entry of sperm into the egg and the subsequent fusion of the egg and sperm nuclei to form a single new nucleus.
- Elisha Gray and Alexander Graham Bell independently, on the same day in 1876, filed patents for the invention of the telephone.
- Charles Cros described the principles of the phonograph in 1877, which was independently constructed the following year (1878) by Thomas Edison.
- Edward Sharpey-Schafer reported to the Royal Society in 1877 his discovery of what eventually came to be called the nerve synapse; the Royal Society was skeptical of the unconventional notion of such spaces separating individual neurons, and asked him to withdraw his report. In 1888, in Spain, Santiago Ramón y Cajal, having used the Italian scientist Camillo Golgi's technique for staining nerve cells, published his own discovery of the nerve synapse, which in 1889 finally gained acceptance and won Ramón y Cajal recognition, alongside Golgi, as the "founder of modern neuroscience".
- British physicist-chemist Joseph Swan independently developed an incandescent light bulb in 1879 at the same time as American inventor Thomas Edison was working on his own incandescent light bulb. Swan's first successful electric light bulb and Edison's electric light bulb were both patented in 1879.
- Circa 1880: the integraph was invented independently by the British physicist Sir Charles Vernon Boys and by the Polish mathematician, inventor, and electrical engineer Bruno Abakanowicz. Abakanowicz's design was produced by the Swiss firm Coradi of Zurich.
- 1886: The Hall–Héroult process for inexpensively producing aluminum was independently discovered by the American engineer-inventor Charles Martin Hall and the French scientist Paul Héroult.
- In 1895 the Russian linguist Filipp Fortunatov, and in 1896 the Swiss linguist Ferdinand de Saussure, independently formulated the sound law now known as the Fortunatov–de Saussure law.
- 1895: Adrenaline was discovered by the Polish physiologist Napoleon Cybulski. It was independently discovered in 1900 by the Japanese chemist Jōkichi Takamine and his assistant Keizo Uenaka.
- 1896: Two proofs of the prime number theorem (the asymptotic law of the distribution of prime numbers) were obtained independently by Jacques Hadamard and Charles de la Vallée-Poussin and appeared the same year.
- 1896: Radioactivity was discovered independently by Henri Becquerel and Silvanus Thompson.
- 1898: Thorium radioactivity was discovered independently by Gerhard Carl Schmidt and Marie Curie.
- Vector calculus was invented independently by the American, Josiah Willard Gibbs (1839–1903), and by the Englishman, Oliver Heaviside (1850–1925).

== 20th century ==
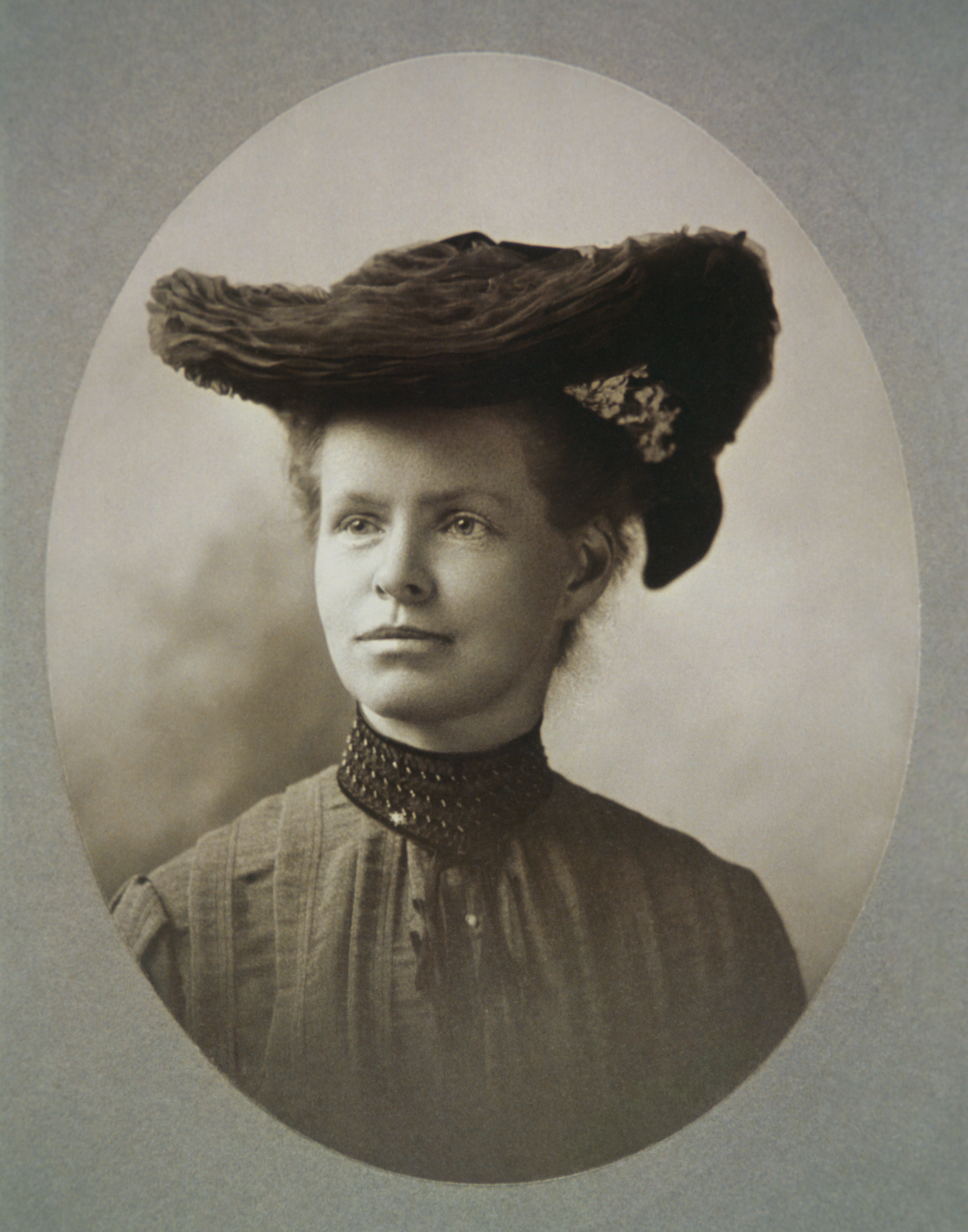
Nettie Stevens

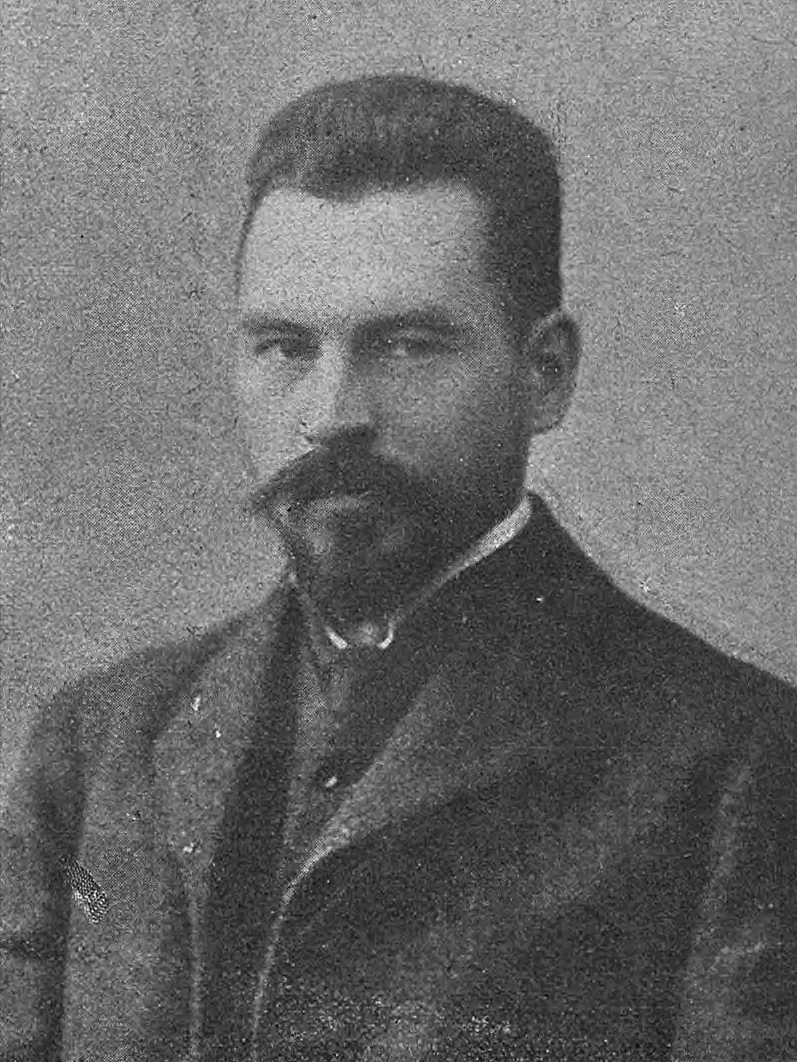
Smoluchowski

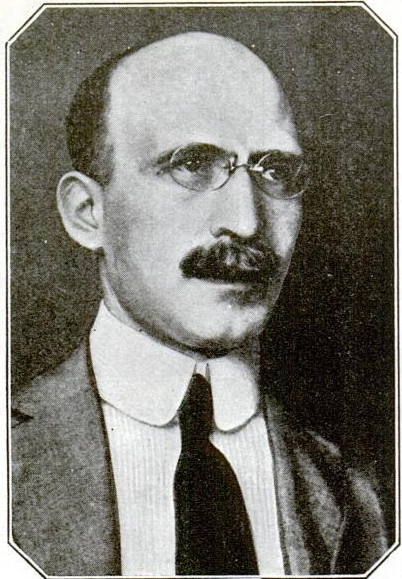
Tykociński-Tykociner

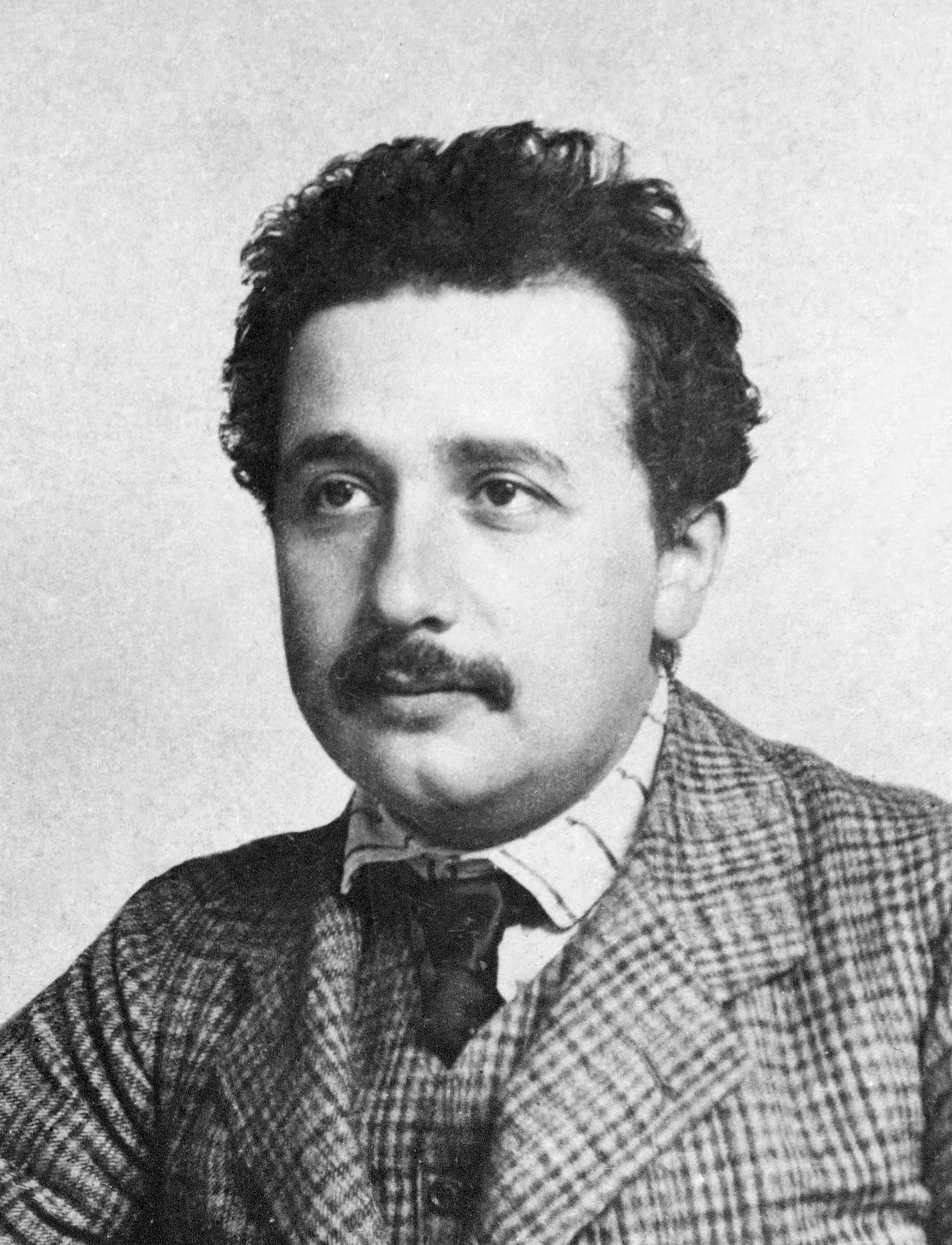
Einstein

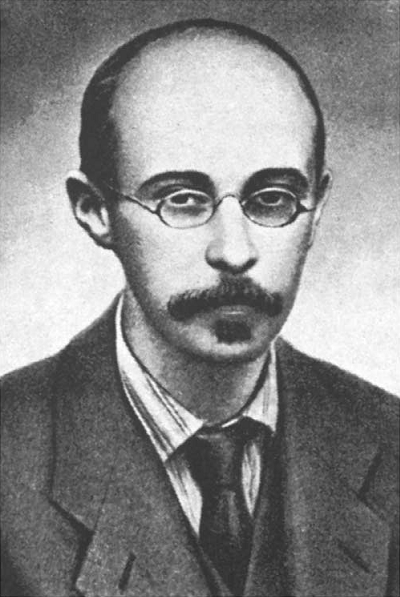
Alexander Friedmann

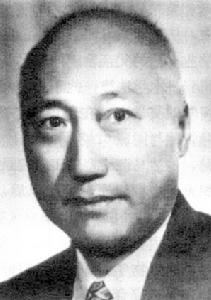
Hsien Wu

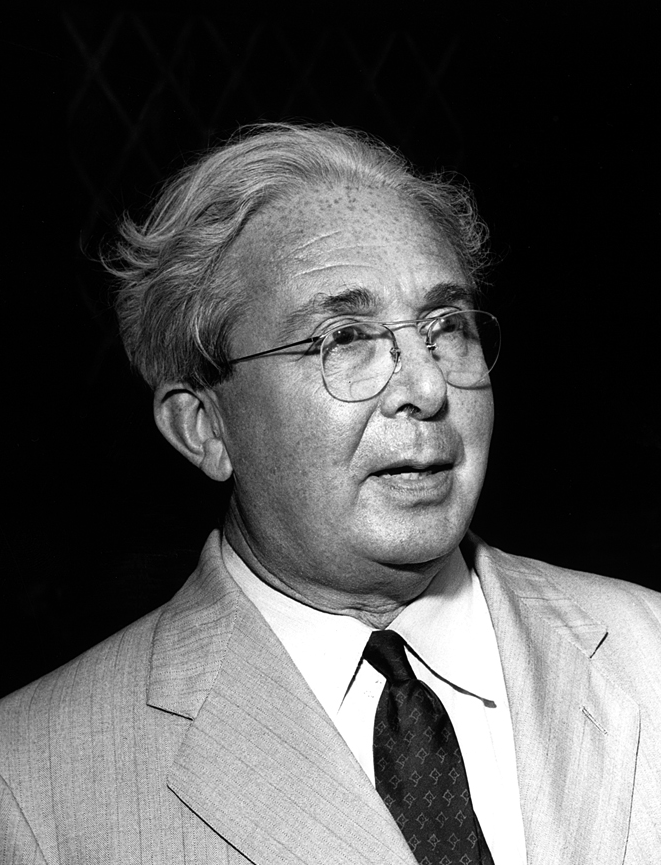
Szilárd

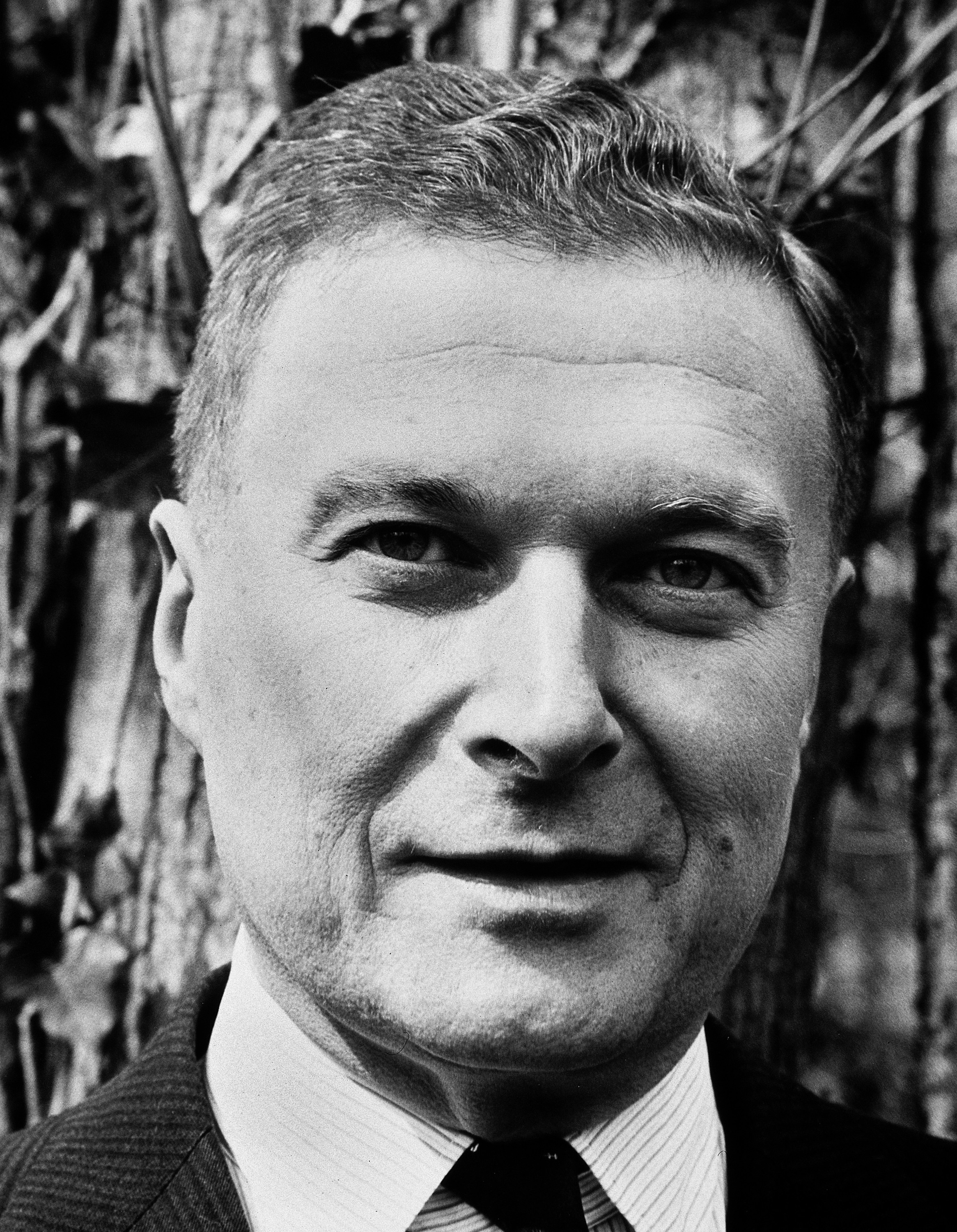
Koprowski

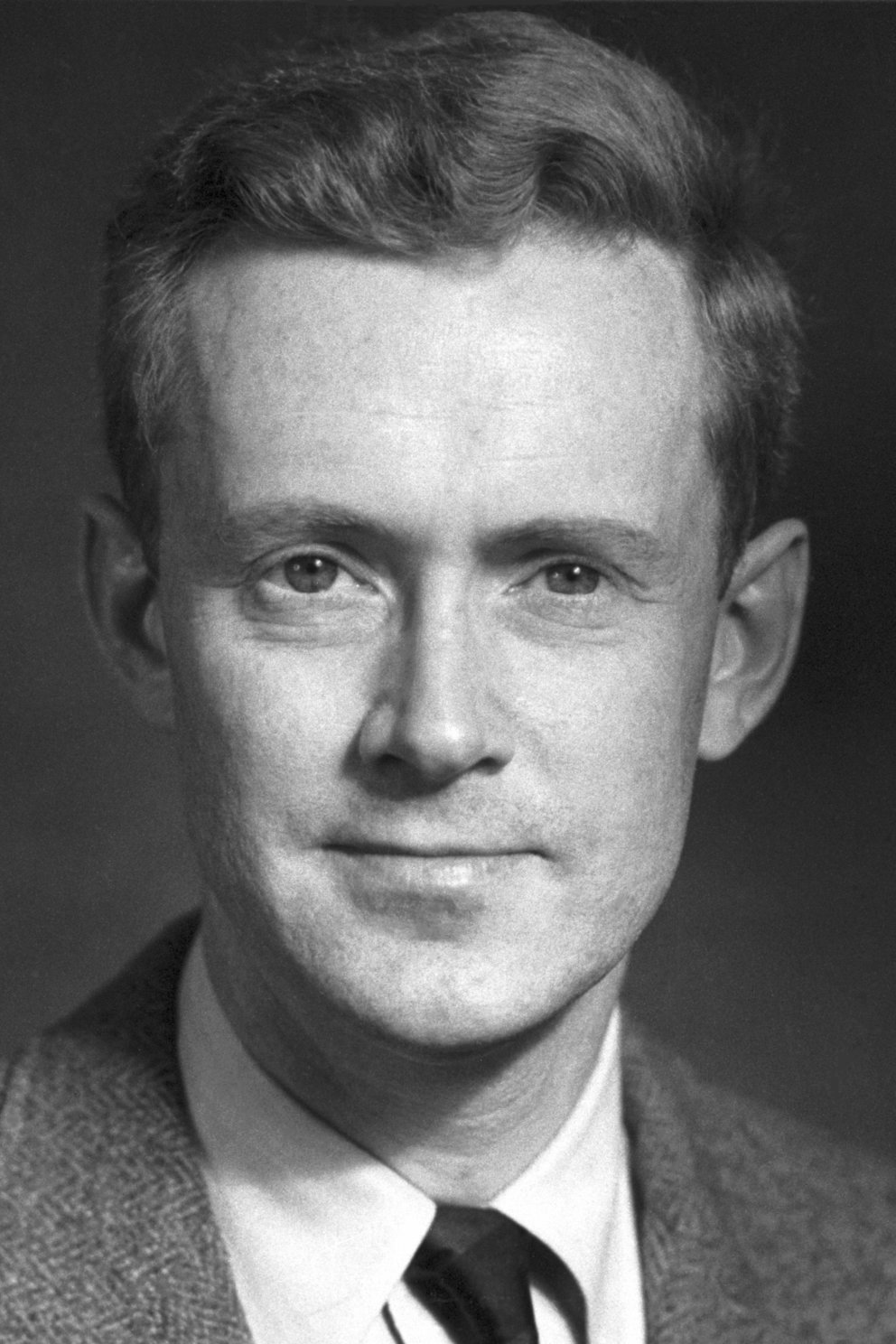
Purcell

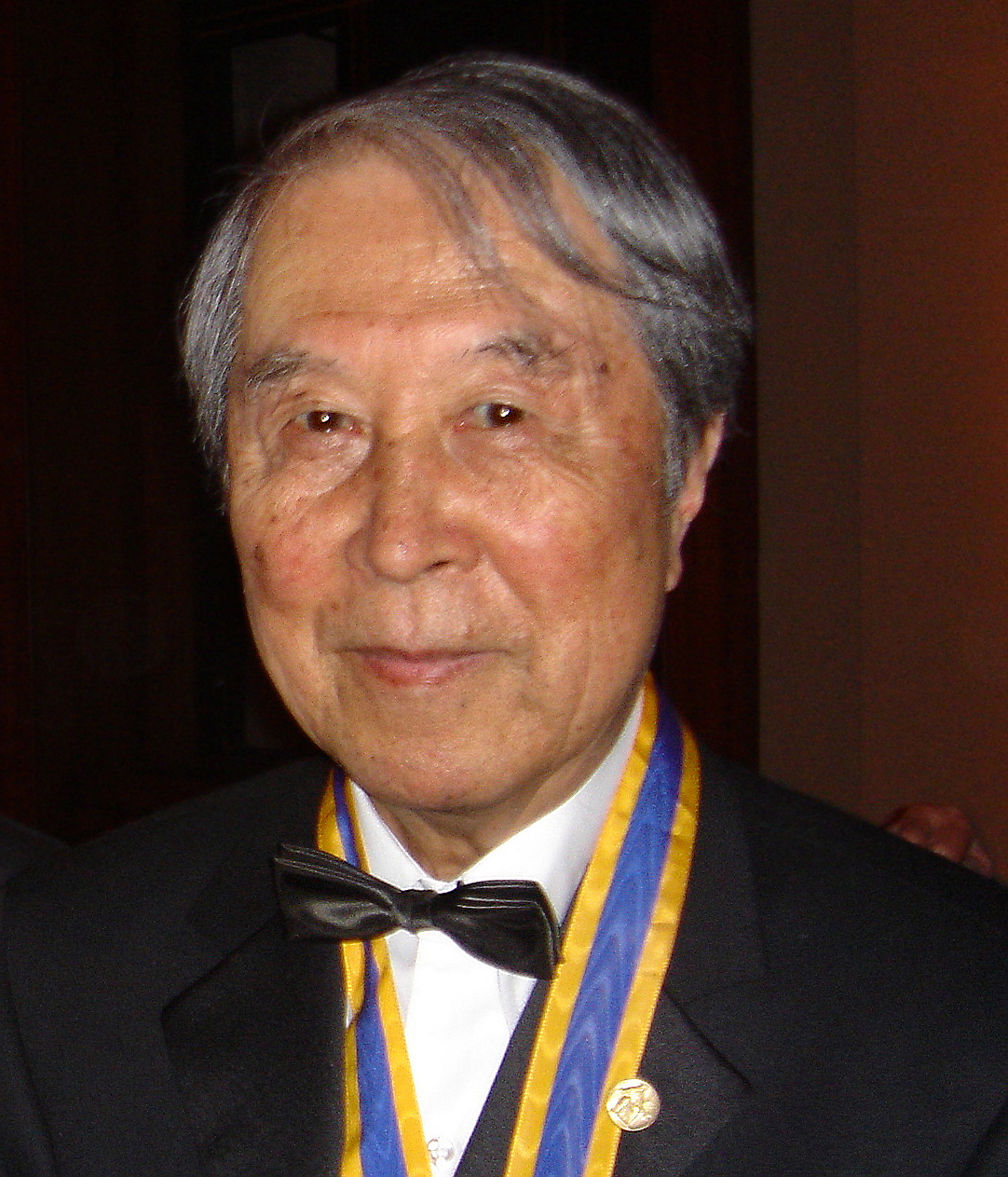
Nambu

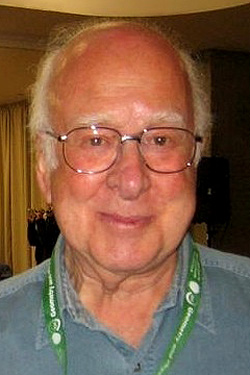
Higgs

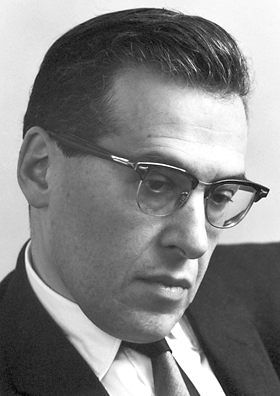
Schwinger

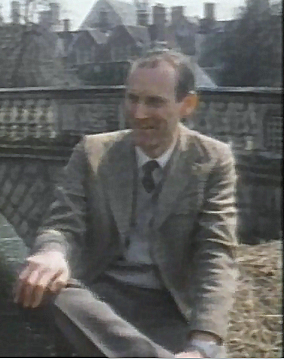
Vine

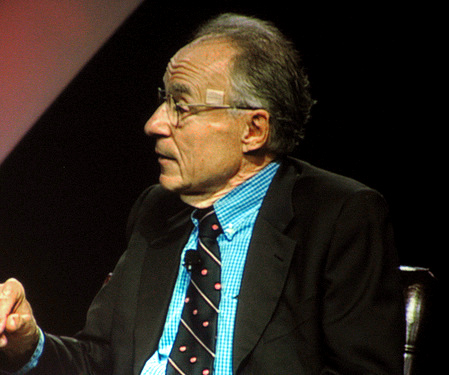
Penzias

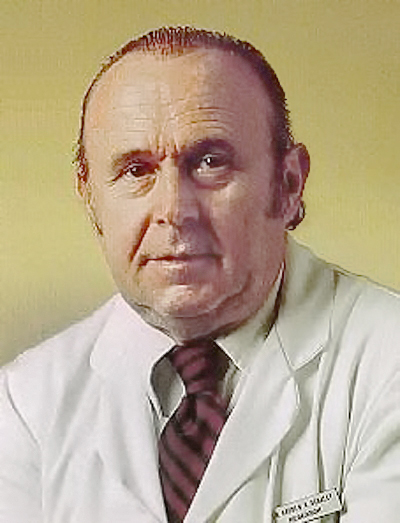
Schally

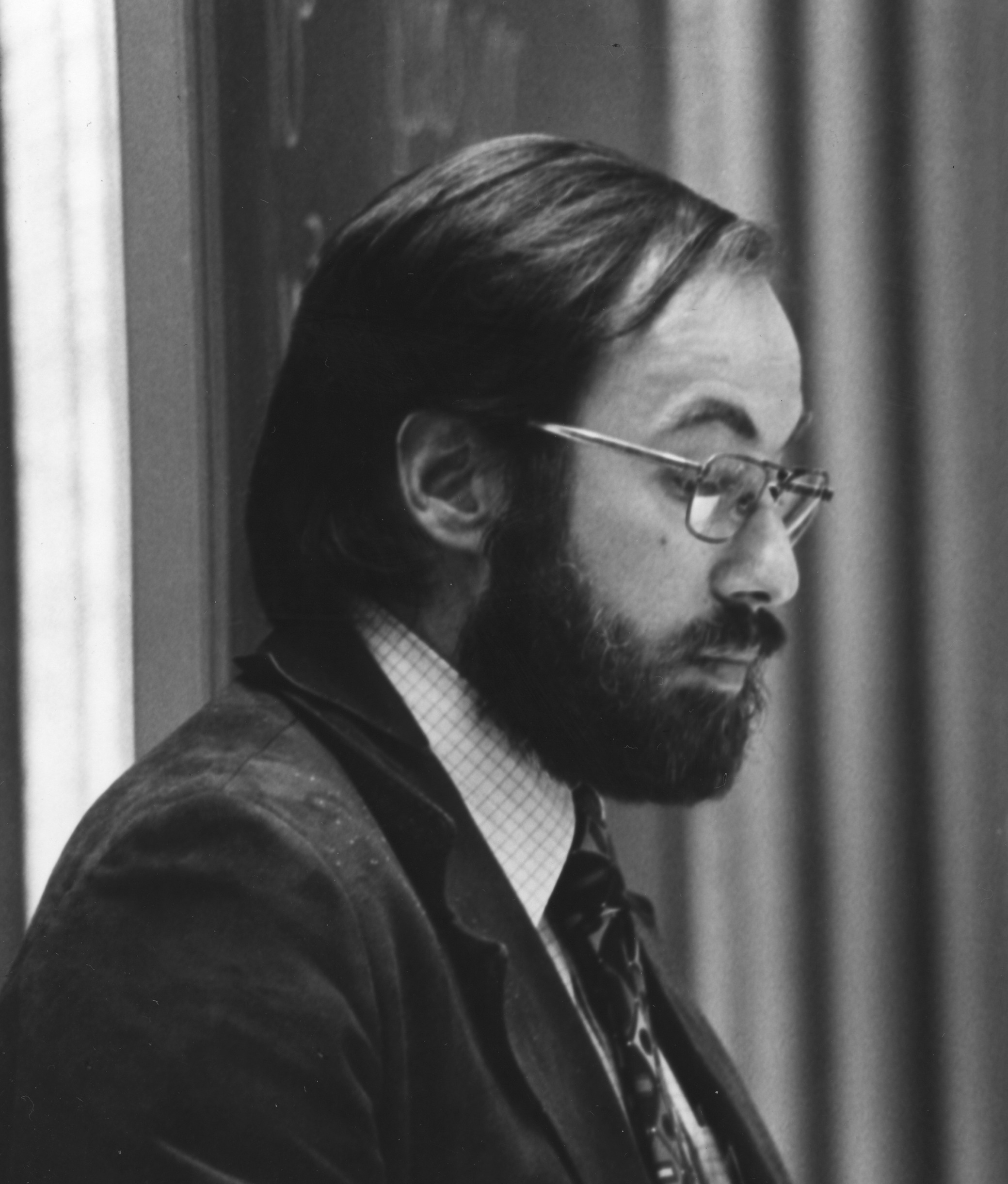
Baltimore

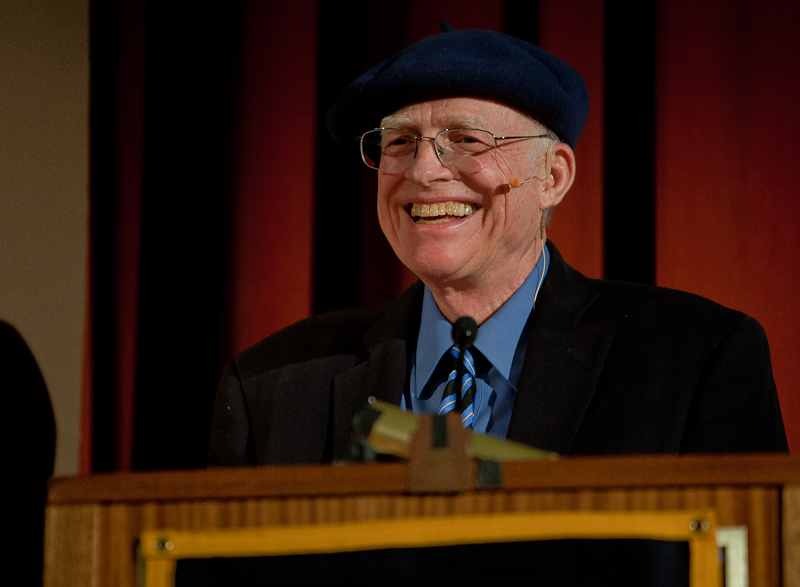
Alvarez

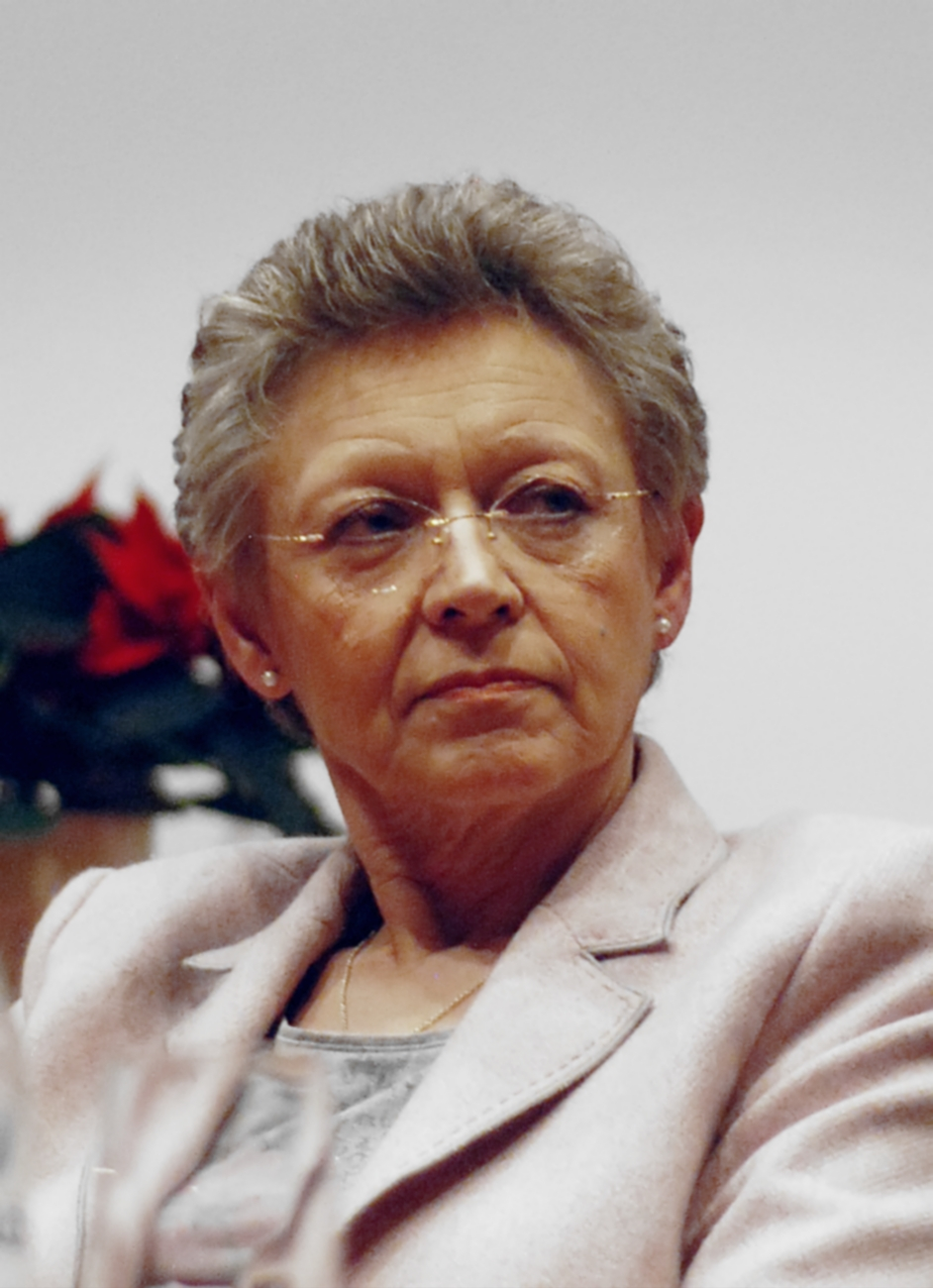
Barré-Sinoussi

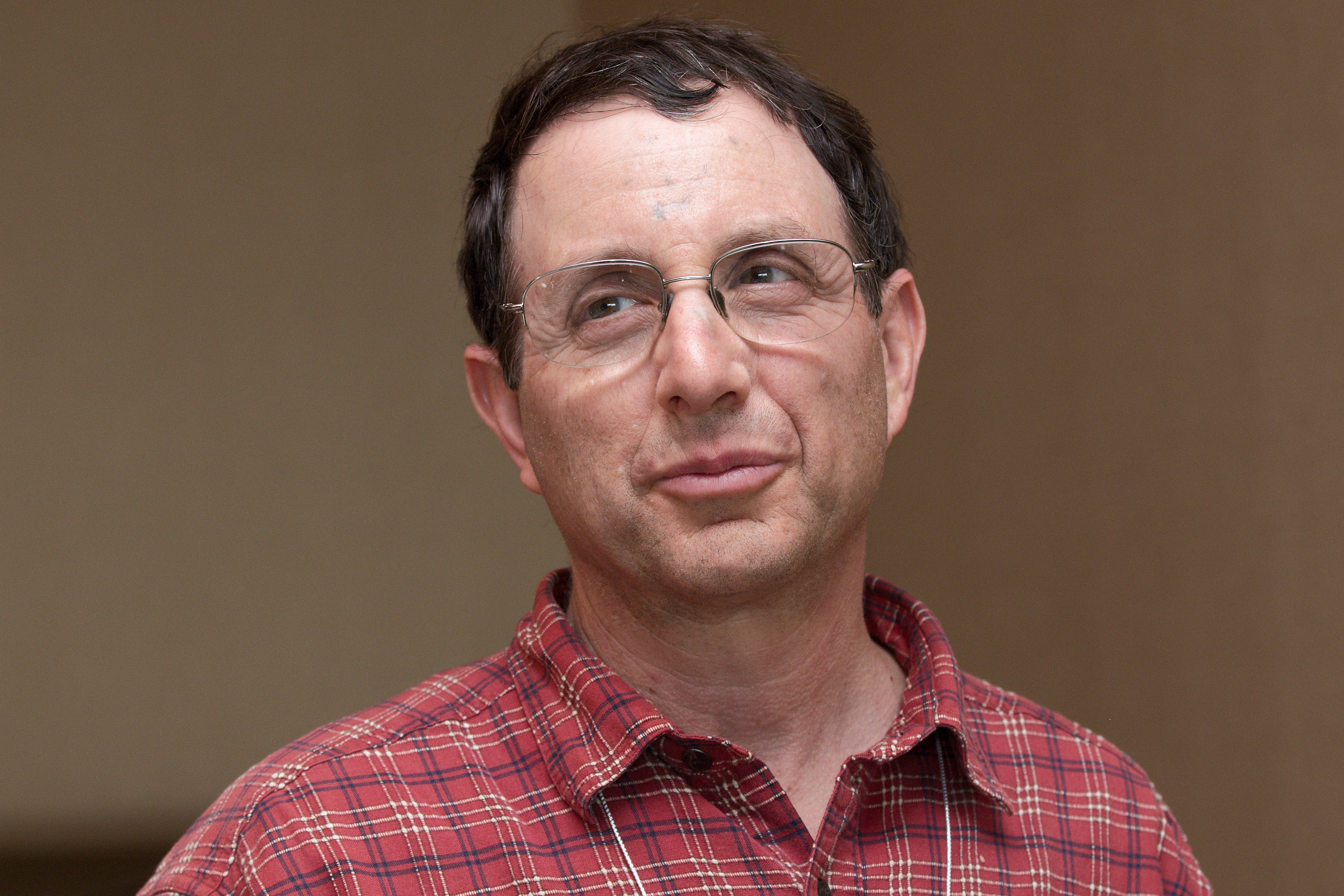
Immerman

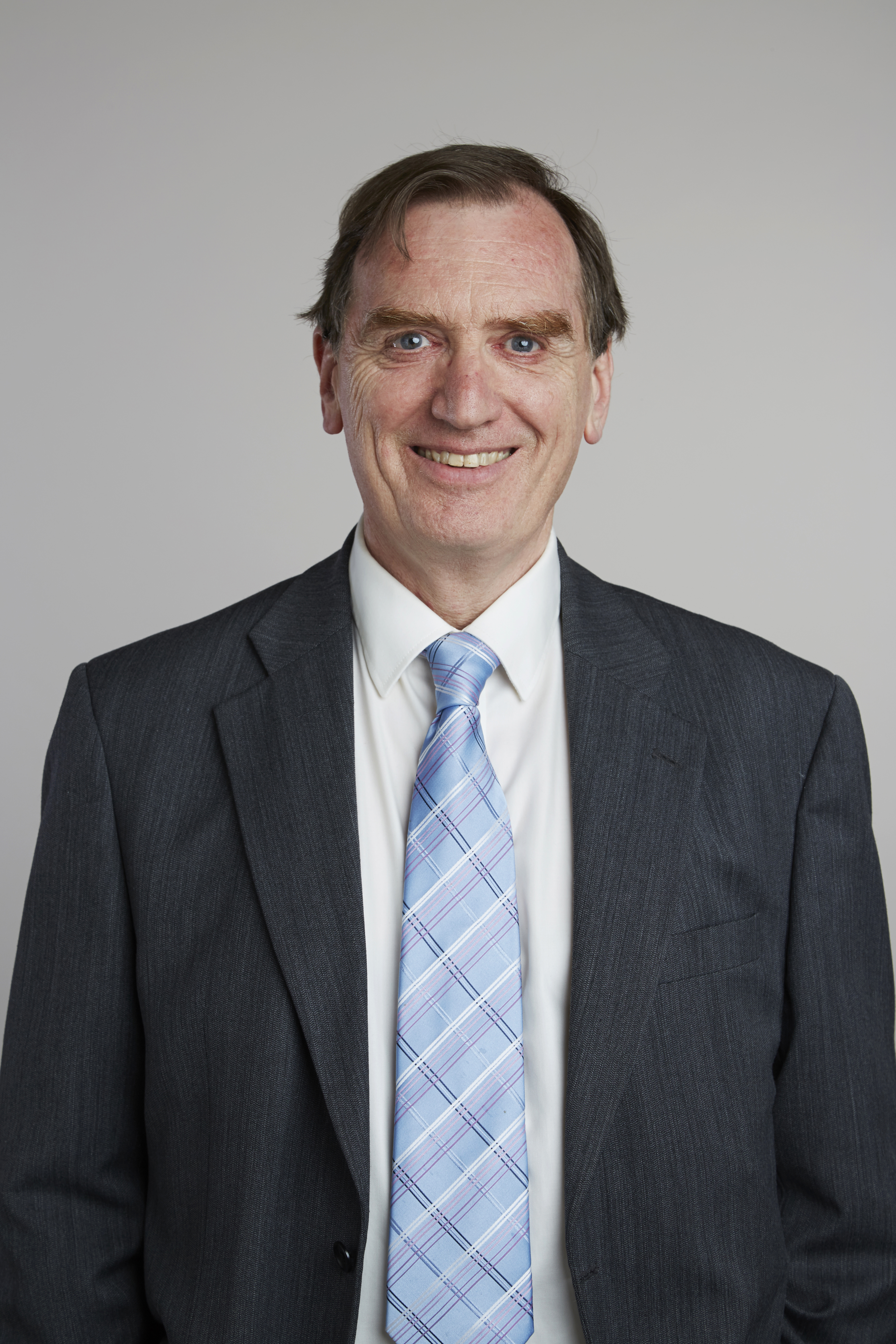
Cocks

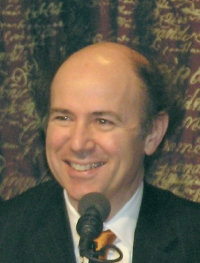
Wilczek

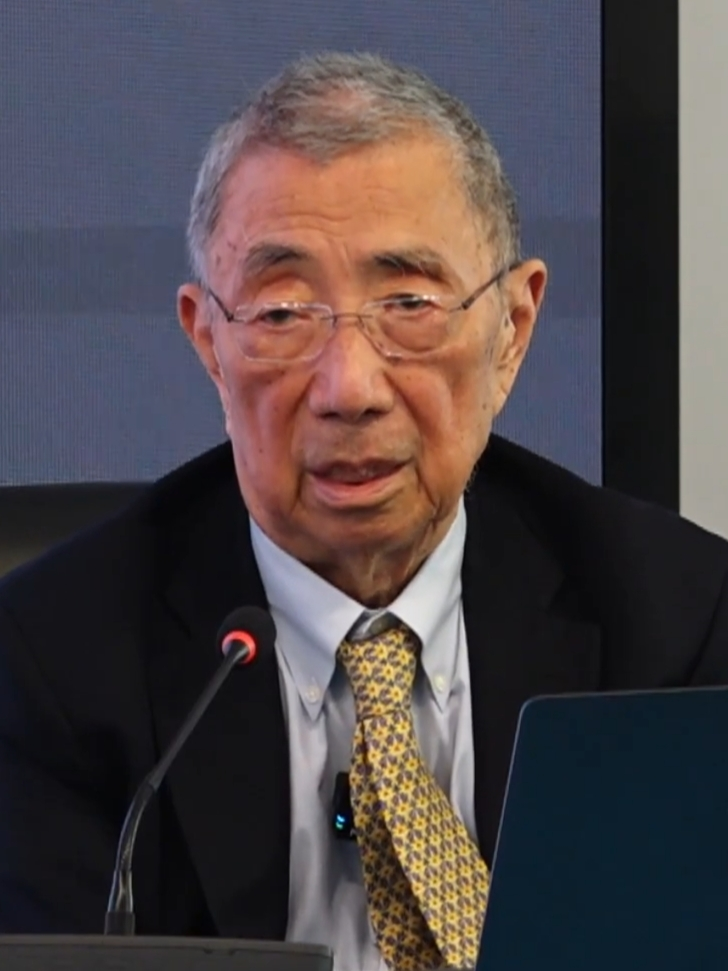
Ting

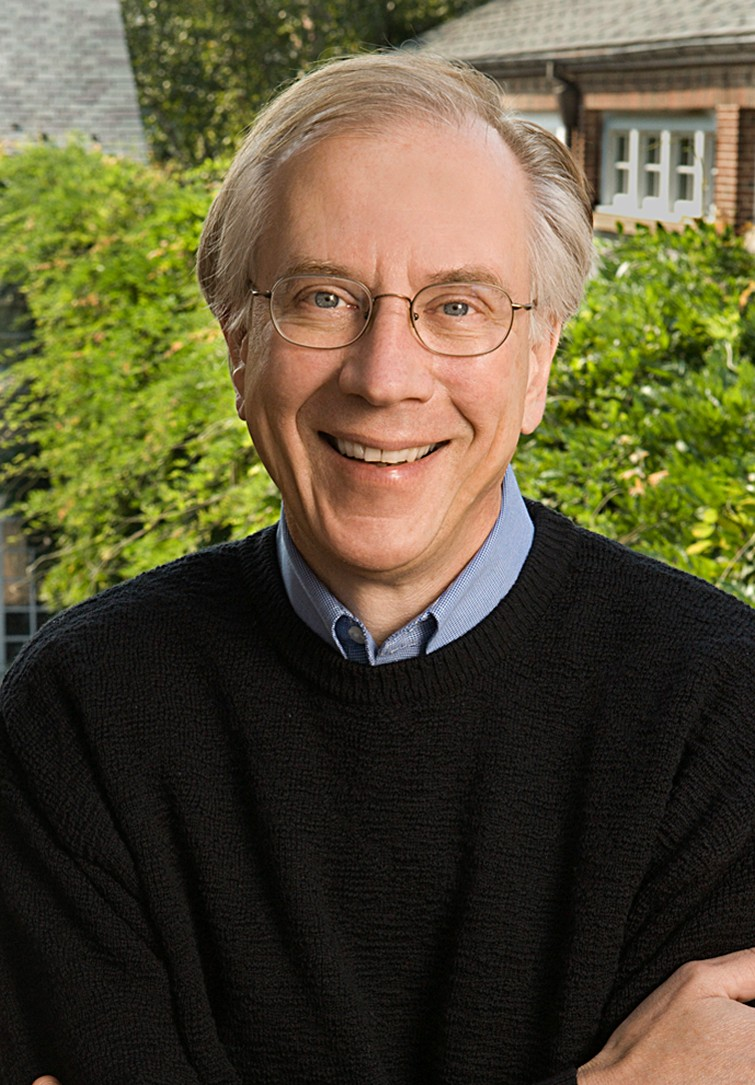
Cech

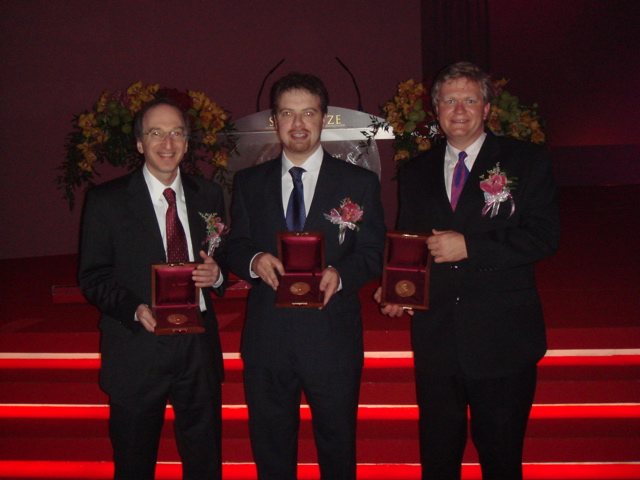
Perlmutter, Riess, Schmidt

- E = mc^{2}, though only Einstein provided the accepted interpretation – Henri Poincaré, 1900; Olinto De Pretto, 1903; Albert Einstein, 1905; Paul Langevin, 1906.
- 1902: Walter Sutton and Theodor Boveri independently proposed that the hereditary information is carried in the chromosomes.
- 1902: Richard Assmann and Léon Teisserenc de Bort independently discovered the stratosphere.
- 1904: Epinephrine synthesized independently by Friedrich Stolz and by Henry Drysdale Dakin.
- 1905: Brownian motion was independently explained by Albert Einstein (in one of his 1905 papers) and by Marian Smoluchowski in 1906.
- 1905: The Einstein Relation was revealed independently by William Sutherland in 1905, by Albert Einstein in 1905, and by Marian Smoluchowski in 1906.
- 1905: The chromosomal XY sex-determination system—that males have XY, and females XX, sex chromosomes—was discovered independently by Nettie Stevens, at Bryn Mawr College, and by Edmund Beecher Wilson at Columbia University.
- 1907: Lutetium discovered independently by French scientist Georges Urbain and by Austrian mineralogist Baron Carl Auer von Welsbach.
- 1907: Hilbert space representation theorem, also known as Riesz representation theorem, the mathematical justification of the Bra-ket notation in the theory of quantum mechanics – independently proved by Frigyes Riesz and Maurice René Fréchet.
- 1908: The Hardy–Weinberg principle is a principle of population genetics that states that, in the absence of other evolutionary influences, allele and genotype frequencies in a population will remain constant from generation to generation. This law was formulated in 1908 independently by German obstetrician-gynecologist Wilhelm Weinberg and, a little later and a little less rigorously, by British mathematician G.H. Hardy.
- 1908: The Stark–Einstein law (aka photochemical equivalence law, or photoequivalence law) – independently formulated between 1908 and 1913 by Johannes Stark and Albert Einstein. It states that every photon that is absorbed will cause a (primary) chemical or physical reaction.
- 1908: Frequency-hopping spread spectrum in radio work was described by Johannes Zenneck (1908), Leonard Danilewicz (1929), Willem Broertjes (1929), and Hedy Lamarr and George Antheil (1942 US patent).
- 1911: Ejnar Hertzsprung created the Hertzsprung–Russell diagram, abbreviated H–R diagram, HR diagram, or HRD – a scatter plot of stars showing the relationship between the stars' absolute magnitudes or luminosities versus their stellar classifications or effective temperatures – a major step toward an understanding of stellar evolution. In 1913 the Hertzsprung–Russell diagram was independently created by Henry Norris Russell.
- 1912-1917: Alexander Bogdanov formulated principles such as feedback, dynamic equilibrium, synergy, and the theory of constraints under the transdisciplinary framework of "tektology". A number of very similar approaches were founded by Ludwig von Bertalanffy (general systems theory, 1950s), Hermann Schmidt (allgemeine Regelkreislehre (universal science of feedback, 1930s), Ștefan Odobleja (psychologie consonantiste, 1936) and Norbert Wiener (cybernetics, 1945).
- By 1913, vitamin A was independently discovered by Elmer McCollum and Marguerite Davis at the University of Wisconsin–Madison, and by Lafayette Mendel and Thomas Burr Osborne at Yale University, who studied the role of fats in the diet.
- 1914: In Argentina, physician Luis Agote was the first to develop the use of sodium citrate in blood transfusions; in Belgium, physician Albert Hustin was independently the first to do so.
- 1915: Bacteriophages (viruses that infect bacteria) – Frederick Twort (1915), Félix d'Hérelle (1917).
- 1915: Rotor cipher machines – Theo A. van Hengel and R.P.C. Spengler (1915); Edward Hebern (1917); Arthur Scherbius (Enigma machine, 1918); Hugo Koch (1919); Arvid Damm (1919).
- 1917–1921: Crystal oscillator – Alexander M. Nicolson (1917, using Rochelle salt); Walter Guyton Cady (1921, using quartz).
- 1921: The simultaneous discovery of Ramsauer-Townsend effect by Carl Ramsauer and John Sealy Townsend (1921).
- 1922: Sound film – Joseph Tykociński-Tykociner (1922), Lee De Forest (1923).
- 1922: The Big Bang theory of the universe—that the universe is expanding from a single original point—was developed from the independent derivation of the Friedmann equations from Albert Einstein's equations of general relativity by the Russian, Alexander Friedmann, in 1922, and by the Belgian, Georges Lemaître, in 1927. The Big Bang theory was confirmed in 1929 by the American astronomer Edwin Hubble's analysis of galactic redshifts. But the Big Bang theory had been presaged three-quarters of a century earlier in the American poet and short-story writer Edgar Allan Poe's then much-derided essay, Eureka: A Prose Poem (1848).
- 1923: Georgios Papanikolaou is credited with discovering as early as 1923 that cervical cancer cells can be detected microscopically, though his invention of the Pap test went largely ignored by physicians until 1943. Aurel Babeş of Romania independently made similar discoveries in 1927.
- 1923: Anodization: Benough-Stuart process developed in the United Kingdom by Guy Dunstan Bengough and John McArthur Stuart for duralumin seaplane corrosion protection using chromic acid (1923); independently, oxalic acid anodizing was developed in Japan by Tsunetaro Kujirai and Sakae Ueki at RIKEN (1924).
- 1924: "Primordial soup" theory of the abiogenetic evolution of life from carbon-based molecules – Alexander Oparin (1924), J.B.S. Haldane (1925).
- 1926: Jet stream was detected in the 1920s by Japanese meteorologist Wasaburo Oishi, whose work largely went unnoticed outside Japan because he published his findings in Esperanto. Often given some credit for discovery of jet streams is American pilot Wiley Post, who in the year before his 1935 death noticed that at times his ground speed greatly exceeded his air speed. Real understanding of the nature of jet streams is often credited to experience in World War II military flights.
- 1926: Borůvka's algorithm, an algorithm for finding a minimum spanning tree in a graph, was first published in 1926 by Otakar Borůvka. The algorithm was rediscovered by Choquet in 1938; again by Florek, Łukasiewicz, Perkal, Steinhaus, and Zubrzycki; and again by Sollin in 1965.
- 1927: The discovery of phosphocreatine was reported by Grace Palmer Eggleton and Philip Eggleton of the University of Cambridge and separately by Cyrus H. Fiske and Yellapragada Subbarow of Harvard Medical School.
- 1929: Dmitri Skobeltsyn first observed the positron in 1929. Chung-Yao Chao also observed the positron in 1929, though he did not recognize it as such.
- 1930s: Quantum electrodynamics and renormalization (1930s–40s): Ernst Stueckelberg, Julian Schwinger, Richard Feynman, and Sin-Itiro Tomonaga, for which the latter 3 received the 1965 Nobel Prize in Physics.
- 1930: Undefinability theorem, an important limitative result in mathematical logic – Kurt Gödel (1930; described in a 1931 private letter, but not published); Alfred Tarski (1933).
- 1930: Chandrasekhar Limit—published by Subramanyan Chandrasekhar (1931–35); also computed by Lev Landau (1932). Also Edmund Clifton Stoner and Wilhelm Anderson (1930)
- 1931: A theory of protein denaturation is widely attributed to Alfred Mirsky and Linus Pauling, who published their paper in 1936, though it had been independently discovered in 1931 by Hsien Wu, whom some now recognize as the originator of the theory.
- Electroluminescence in silicon carbide, now known as the LED, was discovered independently by Oleg Losev in 1927 and by H.J. Round in 1907, and possibly in 1936 in zinc sulfide by Georges Destriau, who believed it was actually a form of incandescence.
- 1932: Zipf's law, described by George Zipf (1932), was previously discovered by Felix Auerbach (1913), Jean-Baptiste Estoup (1916), Godfrey Dewey (1923), Edward U. Condon (1928). The law's naming after a later rediscoverer is therefore an example of Stigler's law of eponymy (named by Stephen Stigler after himself in 1980: see below).
- 1934: Natural deduction, an approach to proof theory in philosophical logic – discovered independently by Gerhard Gentzen and Stanisław Jaśkowski in 1934.
- 1934: The Gelfond–Schneider theorem, in mathematics, establishes the transcendence of a large class of numbers. It was originally proved in 1934 by Aleksandr Gelfond, and again independently in 1935 by Theodor Schneider.
- 1934: The Penrose triangle, also known as the "tribar", is an impossible object. It was first created by the Swedish artist Oscar Reutersvärd in 1934. The mathematician Roger Penrose independently devised and popularized it in the 1950s.
- 1935: Matroid theory, which generalizes notions of independence from linear algebra and graph theory, was independently developed by Hassler Whitney and Takeo Nakasawa.
- 1936: In computer science, the concept of the "universal computing machine" (now generally called the "Turing Machine") was proposed by Alan Turing, but also independently by Emil Post, both in 1936. Similar approaches, also aiming to cover the concept of universal computing, were introduced by S.C. Kleene, Rózsa Péter, and Alonzo Church that same year. Also in 1936, Konrad Zuse tried to build a binary electrically driven mechanical calculator with limited programmability; however, Zuse's machine was never fully functional. The later Atanasoff–Berry Computer ("ABC"), designed by John Vincent Atanasoff and Clifford Berry, was the first fully electronic digital computing device; while not programmable, it pioneered important elements of modern computing, including binary arithmetic and electronic switching elements, though its special-purpose nature and lack of a changeable, stored program distinguish it from modern computers.
- 1938: Benford's law, also known as the Newcomb–Benford law, the law of anomalous numbers, or the first-digit law, was discovered in 1881 by Simon Newcomb and rediscovered in 1938 by Frank Benford. Newcomb's discovery was named after its rediscoverer, Benford, making it an example of Stigler's law of eponymy (named by Stephen Stigler after himself in 1980: see below).
- The atom bomb was independently thought of by Leó Szilárd, Józef Rotblat and others.
- 1939: The jet engine, independently invented by Hans von Ohain (1939), Secondo Campini (1940) and Frank Whittle (1941) and used in working aircraft.
- 1941: In agriculture, the ability of synthetic auxins 2,4-D, 2,4,5-T, and MCPA to act as hormone herbicides was discovered independently by four groups in the United States and Great Britain: William G. Templeman and coworkers (1941); Philip Nutman, Gerard Thornton, and Juda Quastel (1942); Franklin Jones (1942); and Ezra Kraus, John W. Mitchell, and Charles L. Hamner (1943). All four groups were subject to various aspects of wartime secrecy, and the exact order of discovery is a matter of some debate.
- 1947: The point-contact transistor was independently invented in 1947 by Americans William Shockley, John Bardeen and Walter Brattain, working at Bell Labs, and in 1948 by German physicists Herbert Mataré and Heinrich Welker, working at the Compagnie des Freins et Signaux, a Westinghouse subsidiary located in Paris. The Americans were jointly awarded the 1956 Nobel Prize in Physics "for their researches on semiconductors and their discovery of the transistor effect".
- 1949: A formal definition of cliques in graph theory was simultaneously introduced by Luce and Perry (1949) and Festinger (1949).
- Late 1940s: NMR spectroscopy was independently developed in the late 1940s and early 1950s by the Purcell group at Harvard University and the Bloch group at Stanford University. Edward Mills Purcell and Felix Bloch shared the 1952 Nobel Prize in Physics for their discoveries.
- 1950: Polio vaccine (1950–63): Hilary Koprowski, Jonas Salk, Albert Sabin.
- 1952: The maser, a precursor to the laser, was described by Russian scientists in 1952, and built independently by scientists at Columbia University in 1953. The laser itself was developed independently by Gordon Gould at Columbia University and by researchers at Bell Labs, and by the Russian scientist Aleksandr Prokhorov.
- 1958: The integrated circuit was devised independently by Jack Kilby in 1958 and half a year later by Robert Noyce. Kilby won the 2000 Nobel Prize in Physics for his part in the invention of the integrated circuit.
- Late 1950s: The QR algorithm for calculating eigenvalues and eigenvectors of matrices was developed independently in the late 1950s by John G. F. Francis and by Vera N. Kublanovskaya. The algorithm is considered one of the most important developments in numerical linear algebra of the 20th century.
- 1960s: Kolmogorov complexity, also known as "Kolmogorov–Chaitin complexity", descriptive complexity, etc., of an object such as a piece of text is a measure of the computational resources needed to specify the object. The concept was independently introduced by Ray Solomonoff, Andrey Kolmogorov and Gregory Chaitin in the 1960s.
- Early 1960s: The concept of packet switching, a communications method in which discrete blocks of data (packets) are routed between nodes over data links, was first explored by Paul Baran in the early 1960s, and then independently a few years later by Donald Davies.
- Early 1960s: The principles of atomic layer deposition, a thin-film growth method that in the 2000s contributed to the continuation of semiconductor-device scaling in accord with Moore's law, were independently discovered in the early 1960s by the Soviet scientists Valentin Aleskovsky and Stanislav Koltsov and in 1974 by the Finnish inventor Tuomo Suntola.
- Capital Asset Pricing Model (CAPM) is a popular model in finance for trading off risk versus return. Three separate authors published it in academic journals and a fourth circulated unpublished papers.
- 1963: In a major advance in the development of plate tectonics theory, the Vine–Matthews–Morley hypothesis was independently proposed by Lawrence Morley, and by Fred Vine and Drummond Matthews, linking seafloor spreading and the symmetric "zebra pattern" of magnetic reversals in the basalt rocks on either side of mid-ocean ridges.
- Cosmic microwave background as a signature of the Big Bang was confirmed by Arno Penzias and Robert Wilson of Bell Labs. Penzias and Wilson had been testing a very sensitive microwave detector when they noticed that their equipment was picking up a strange noise that was independent of the orientation (direction) of their instrument. At first they thought the noise was generated due to pigeon droppings in the detector, but even after they removed the droppings the noise was still detected. Meanwhile, at nearby Princeton University two physicists, Robert Dicke and Jim Peebles, were working on a suggestion of George Gamow's that the early universe had been hot and dense; they believed its hot glow could still be detected but would be so red-shifted that it would manifest as microwaves. When Penzias and Wilson learned about this, they realized that they had already detected the red-shifted microwaves and (to the disappointment of Dicke and Peebles) were awarded the 1978 Nobel Prize in physics.
- 1963: Conductive polymers: Between 1963 and 1977, doped and oxidized highly conductive polyacetylene derivatives were independently discovered, "lost", and then rediscovered at least four times. The last rediscovery won the 2000 Nobel prize in Chemistry, for the "discovery and development of conductive polymers". This was without reference to the previous discoveries.
- 1964: The relativistic model for the Higgs mechanism was developed by three independent groups: Robert Brout and François Englert; Peter Higgs; and Gerald Guralnik, Carl Richard Hagen, and Tom Kibble. Slightly later, in 1965, it was also proposed by Soviet undergraduate students Alexander Migdal and Alexander Markovich Polyakov. The existence of the "Higgs boson" was finally confirmed in 2012; Higgs and Englert were awarded a Nobel Prize in 2013.
- 1965: The Cocke–Younger–Kasami algorithm was independently discovered three times: by T. Kasami (1965), by Daniel H. Younger (1967), and by John Cocke and Jacob T. Schwartz (1970).
- The Wagner–Fischer algorithm, in computer science, was discovered and published at least six times.
- 1967: The affine scaling method for solving linear programming was discovered by Soviet mathematician I.I. Dikin in 1967. It went unnoticed in the West for two decades, until two groups of researchers in the U.S. reinvented it in 1985.
- 1968: Neutral theory of molecular evolution was introduced by a Japanese biologist, Motoo Kimura, in 1968, and independently by two American biologists, Jack Lester King and Thomas Hughes Jukes, in 1969.
- 1969: Thyrotropin-releasing hormone (TRH) structure was determined, and the hormone synthesized, independently by Andrew V. Schally and Roger Guillemin, who shared the 1977 Nobel Prize in Medicine.
- 1970: Howard Temin and David Baltimore independently discovered reverse transcriptase enzymes.
- The Knuth–Morris–Pratt string searching algorithm was developed by Donald Knuth and Vaughan Pratt and independently by J. H. Morris.
- 1971: The Cook–Levin theorem (also known as "Cook's theorem"), a result in computational complexity theory, was proven independently by Stephen Cook (1971 in the U.S.) and by Leonid Levin (1973 in the USSR). Levin was not aware of Cook's achievement because of communication difficulties between East and West during the Cold War. The other way round, Levin's work was not widely known in the West until around 1978.
- 1972: The Bohlen–Pierce scale, a harmonic, non-octave musical scale, was independently discovered by Heinz Bohlen (1972), Kees van Prooijen (1978) and John R. Pierce (1984).
- 1973: RSA, an algorithm suitable for signing and encryption in public-key cryptography, was publicly described in 1977 by Ron Rivest, Adi Shamir and Leonard Adleman. An equivalent system had been described in 1973 in an internal document by Clifford Cocks, a British mathematician working for the UK intelligence agency GCHQ, but his work was not revealed until 1997 due to its top-secret classification.
- 1973: Asymptotic freedom, which states that the strong nuclear interaction between quarks decreases with decreasing distance, was discovered in 1973 by David Gross and Frank Wilczek, and by David Politzer, and was published in the same 1973 edition of the journal Physical Review Letters. For their work the three received the Nobel Prize in Physics in 2004.
- 1974: The J/ψ meson was independently discovered by a group at the Stanford Linear Accelerator Center, headed by Burton Richter, and by a group at Brookhaven National Laboratory, headed by Samuel Ting of MIT. Both announced their discoveries on 11 November 1974. For their shared discovery, Richter and Ting shared the 1976 Nobel Prize in Physics.
- 1975: Endorphins were discovered independently in Scotland and the US in 1975.
- 1975: Two English biologists, Robin Holliday and John Pugh, and an American biologist, Arthur Riggs, independently suggested that methylation, a chemical modification of DNA that is heritable and can be induced by environmental influences, including physical and emotional stresses, has an important part in controlling gene expression. This concept has become foundational for the field of epigenetics, with its multifarious implications for physical and mental health and for sociopolitics.
- 1976: Mevastatin (compactin; ML-236B) was independently discovered by Akira Endo in Japan in a culture of Penicillium citrinium and by a British group in a culture of Penicillium brevicompactum. Both reports were published in 1976.
- 1980: The asteroid cause of the Cretaceous-Tertiary extinction that wiped out much life on Earth, including all dinosaurs except for birds, was published in Science by Luis and Walter Alvarez et al.; and independently 2 weeks earlier, in Nature, by Dutch geologist Jan Smit and Belgian geologist Jan Hertogen.
- 1980: Stigler's law of eponymy, stating that no scientific discovery is named after its original discoverer, was self-named for ironic effect by Stephen Stigler (1980), who acknowledged that this law had earlier been discovered by many others, including Henry Dudeney (1917).
- 1983: Two separate research groups led by American Robert Gallo and French investigators Françoise Barré-Sinoussi and Luc Montagnier independently declared that a novel retrovirus may have been infecting AIDS patients, and published their findings in the same issue of the journal Science. A third contemporaneous group, at the University of California, San Francisco, led by Dr. Jay Levy, in 1983 independently discovered an AIDS virus which was very different from that reported by the Montagnier and Gallo groups and which indicated, for the first time, the heterogeneity of HIV isolates.
- 1983: Neodymium magnets—independently developed by Sumitomo (Masato Sagawa) and GM (John J. Croat).
- 1984: Quantum cryptography—the first cryptographic method to rely not on mathematical complexity but on the laws of physics—was first postulated in 1984 by Charles Bennett and Gilles Brassard, working together, and later independently, in 1991, by Artur Ekert. The earlier scheme has proven the more practical.
- 1984: Comet Levy-Rudenko was discovered independently by David H. Levy on 13 November 1984 and the next evening by Michael Rudenko. (It was the first of 23 comets discovered by Levy, who is famous as the 1993 co-discoverer of Comet Shoemaker-Levy 9, the first comet ever observed crashing into a planet, Jupiter.)
- 1985: The use of elliptic curves in cryptography (elliptic curve cryptography) was suggested independently by Neal Koblitz and Victor S. Miller in 1985.
- 1987: The Immerman–Szelepcsényi theorem, another fundamental result in computational complexity theory, was proven independently by Neil Immerman and Róbert Szelepcsényi in 1987.
- 1989: Thomas R. Cech (Colorado) and Sidney Altman (Yale) won the Nobel Prize in chemistry for their independent discovery in the 1980s of ribozymes – for the "discovery of catalytic properties of RNA" – using different approaches. Catalytic RNA was an unexpected finding, something they were not looking for, and it required rigorous proof that there was no contaminating protein enzyme.
- 1993: groups led by Donald S. Bethune at IBM and Sumio Iijima at NEC independently discovered single-wall carbon nanotubes and methods to produce them using transition-metal catalysts.
- 1994: The local average treatment effect (LATE) was first introduced in the econometrics literature in 1994 by Guido W. Imbens and Joshua D. Angrist, who shared half of the 2021 Nobel Memorial Prize in Economic Sciences. Stuart G. Baker and Karen S. Lindeman in 1994 independently published the LATE method for a binary outcome with the paired availability design and the key monotonicity assumption. An early version of LATE involved one-sided noncompliance (and hence no monotonicity assumption). In 1983 Baker wrote a technical report describing LATE for one-sided noncompliance that was published in 2016 in a supplement. In 1984, Bloom published a paper on LATE with one-sided compliance. A history of multiple discoveries involving LATE appears in Baker and Lindeman (2024).
- 1998: Saul Perlmutter, Adam G. Riess, and Brian P. Schmidt—working as members of two independent projects, the Supernova Cosmology Project and the High-Z Supernova Search Team—simultaneously discovered in 1998, through observations of distant supernovae, the accelerating expansion of the universe. For this, they were jointly awarded the 2006 Shaw Prize in Astronomy and the 2011 Nobel Prize in Physics.

== 21st century ==
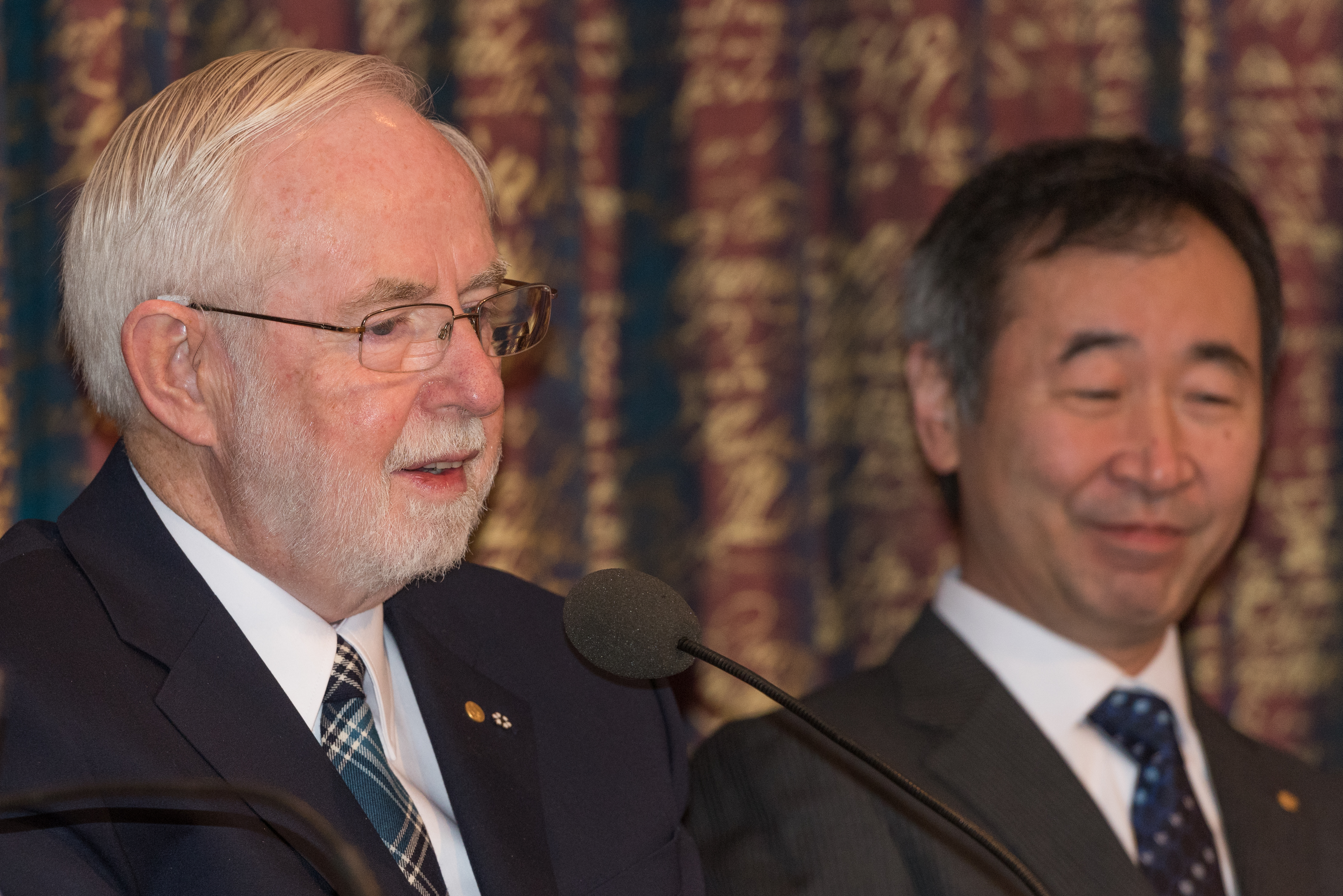
McDonald, Kajita

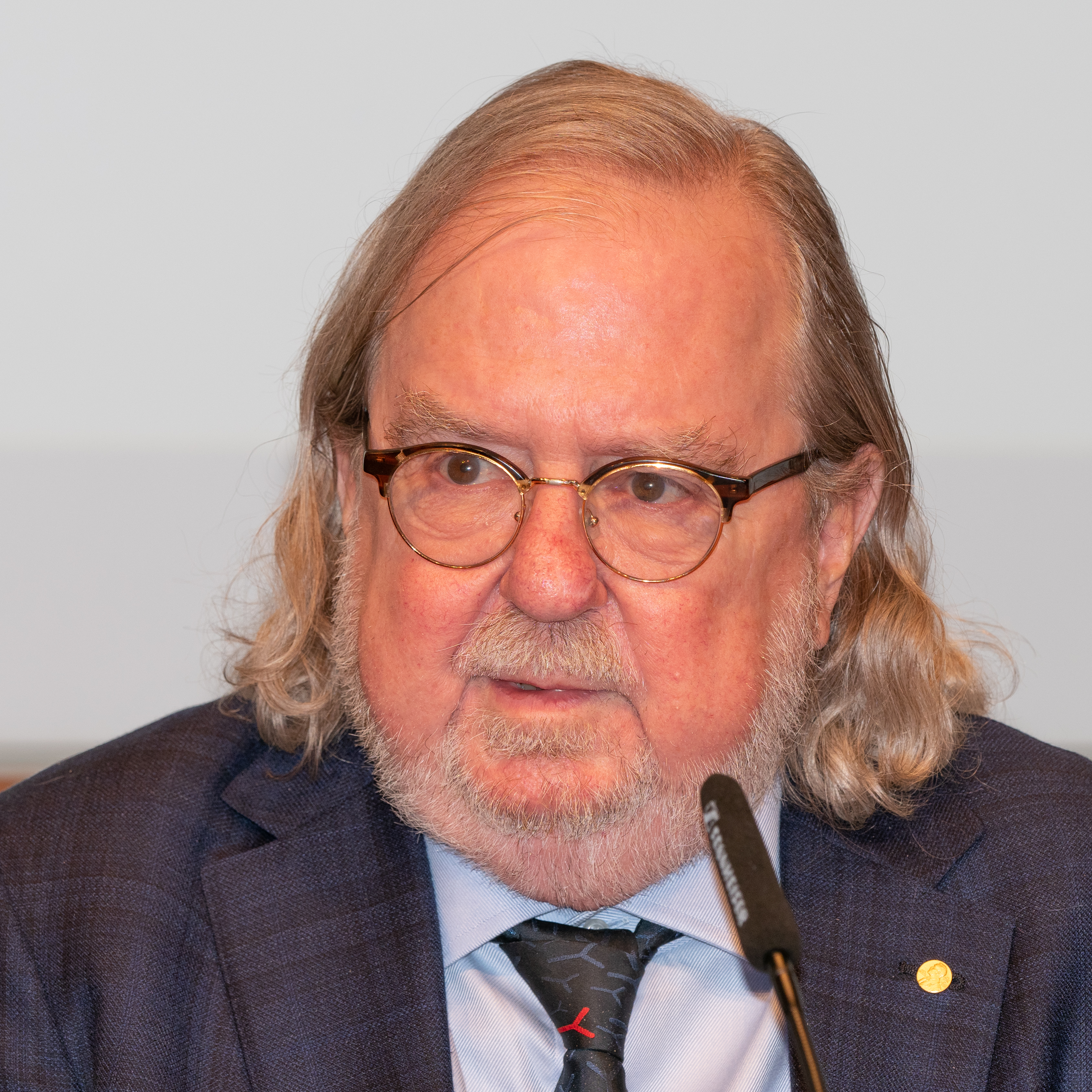
Allison

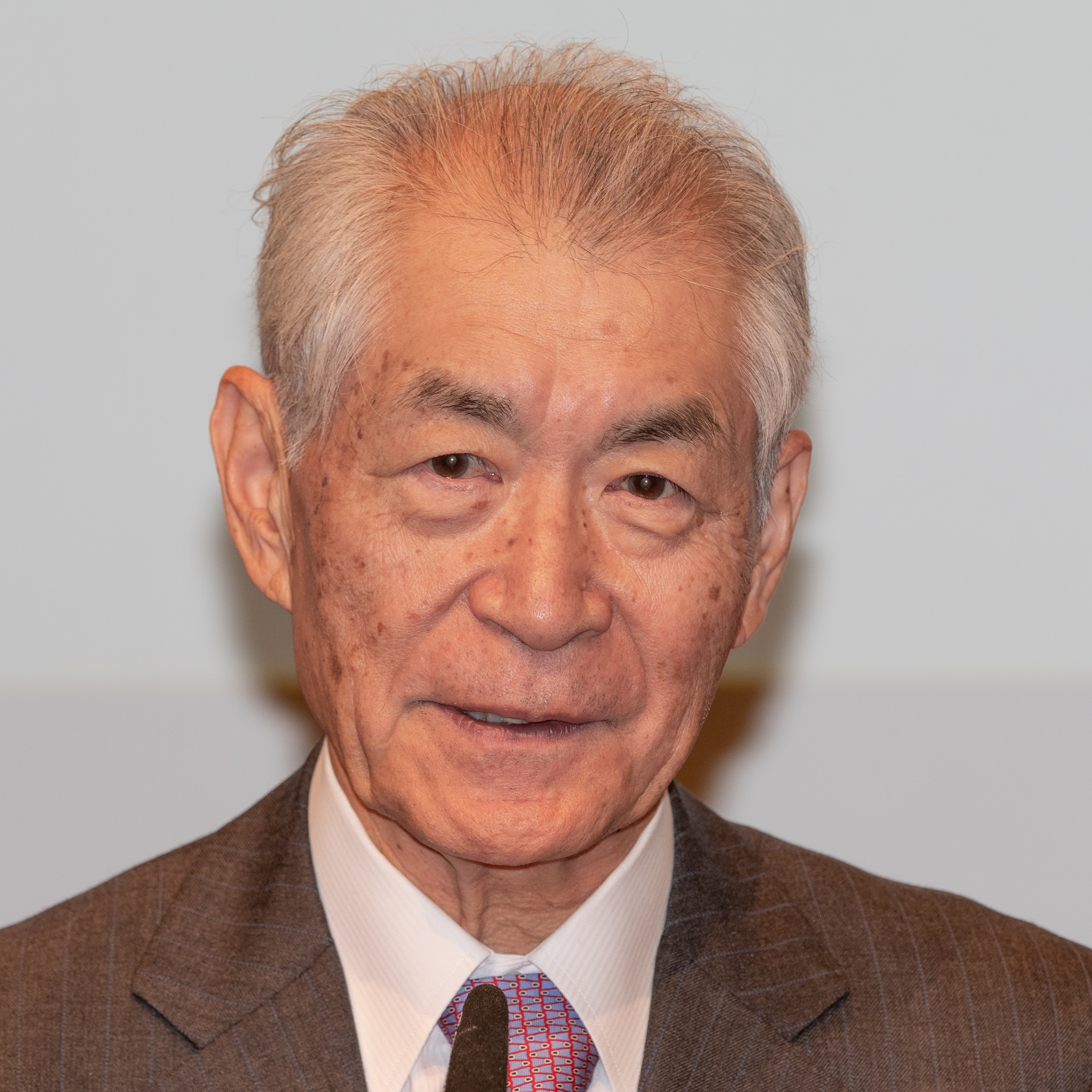
Honjo

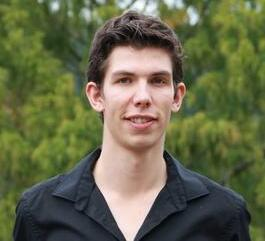
Maynard

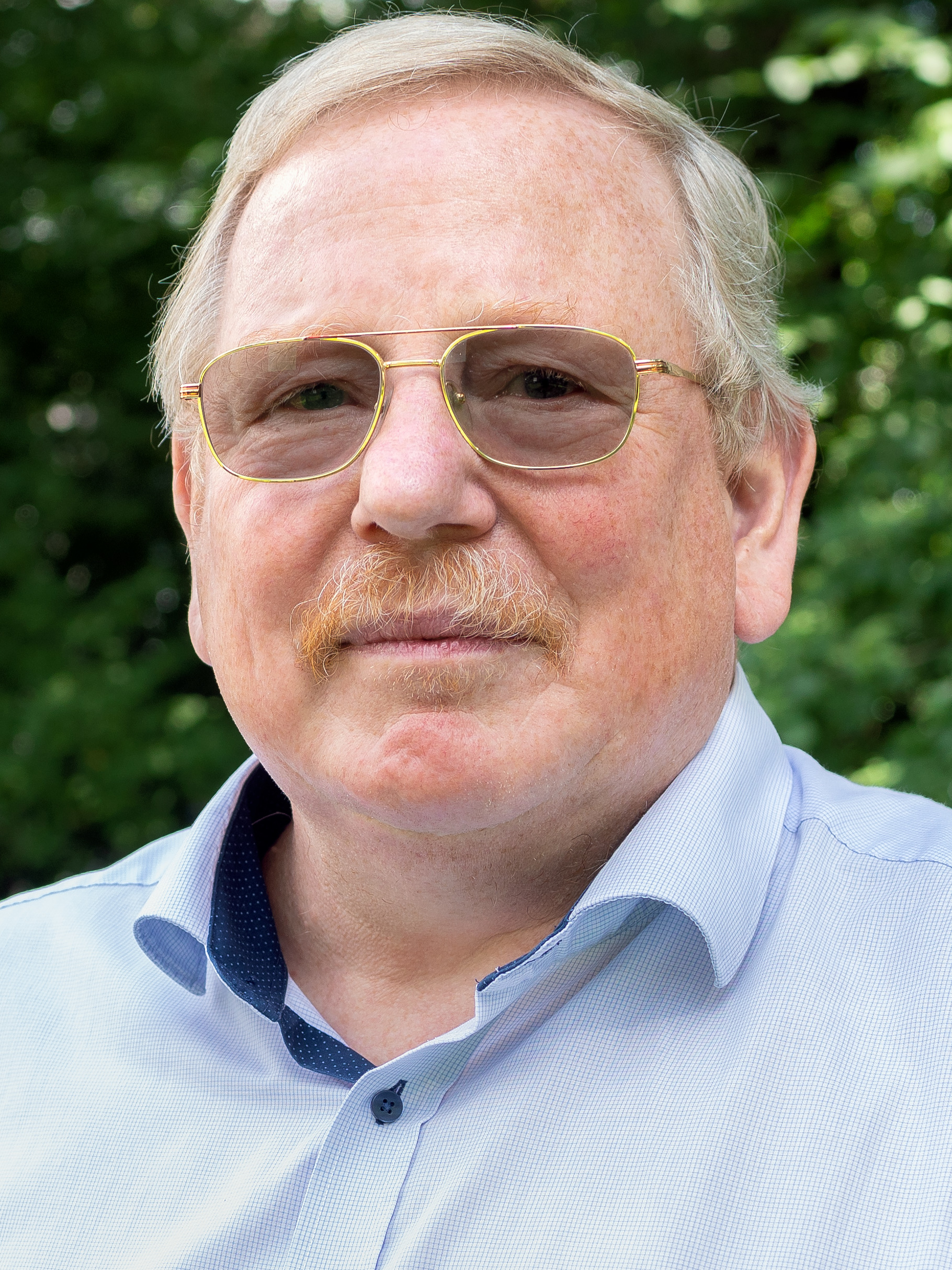
Genzel

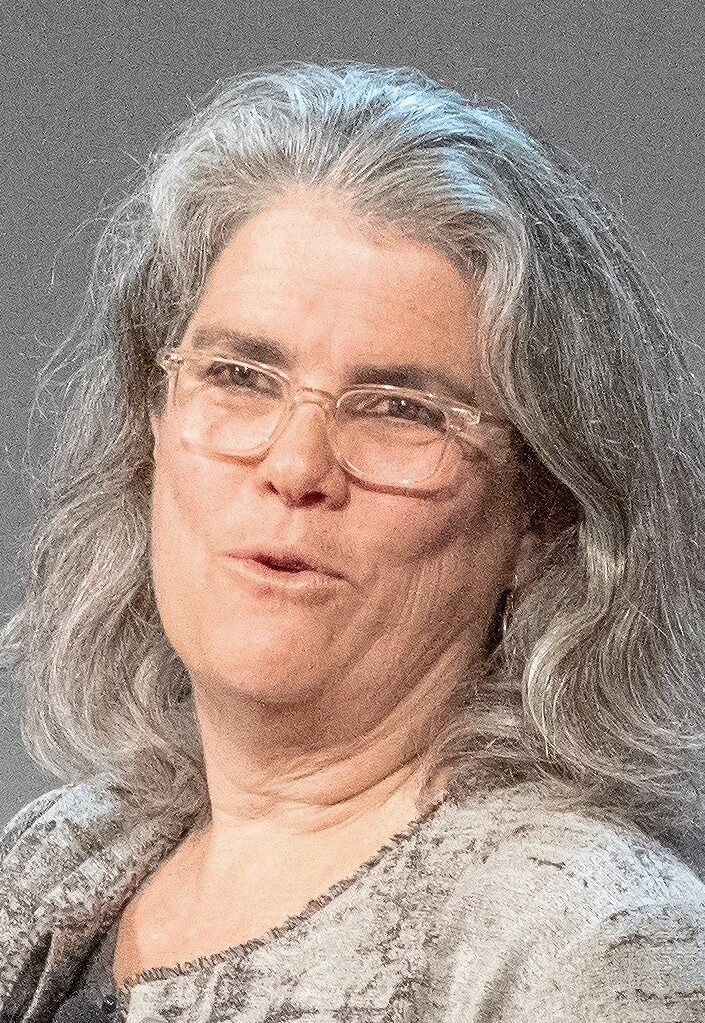
Ghez

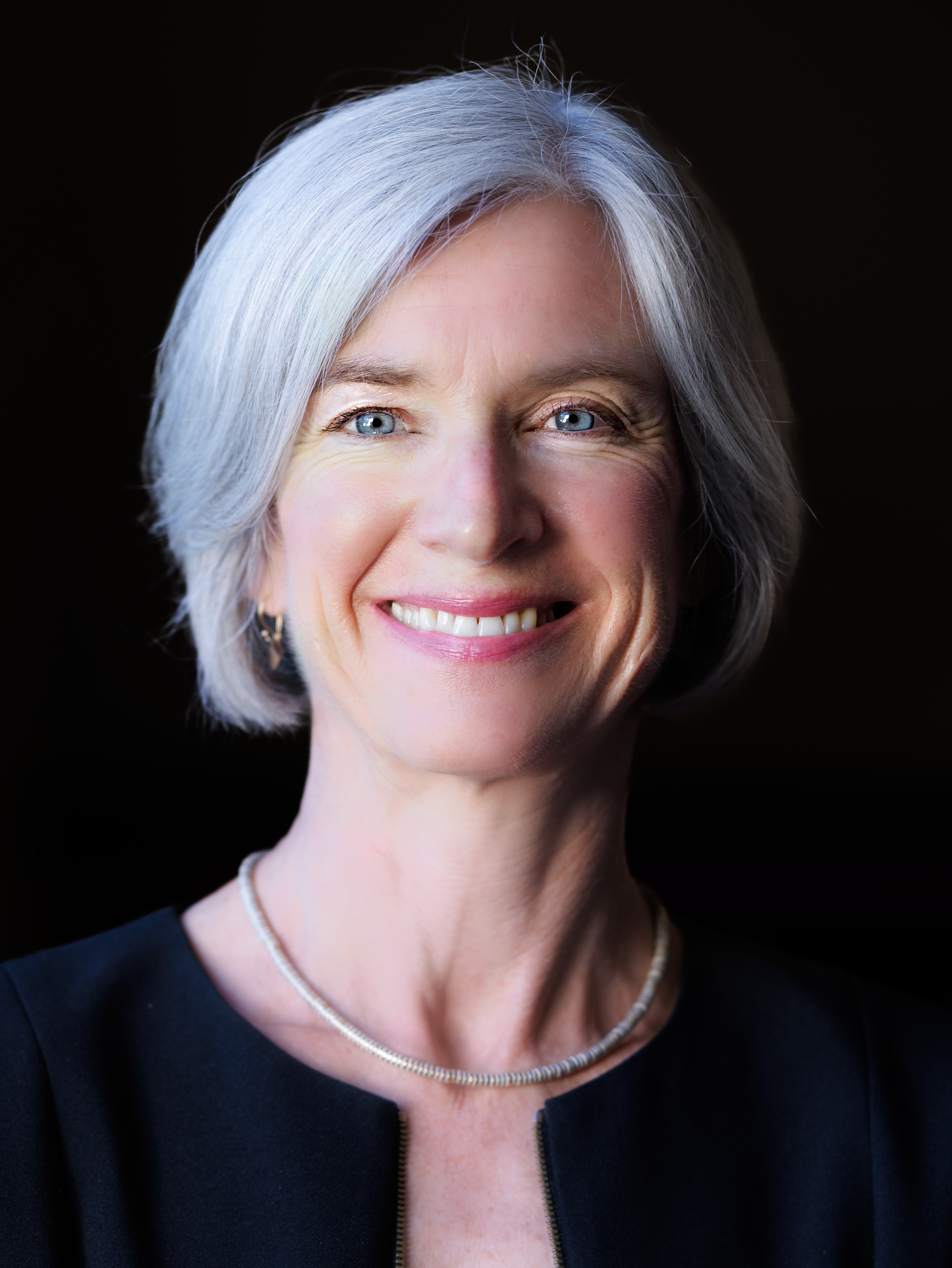
Doudna

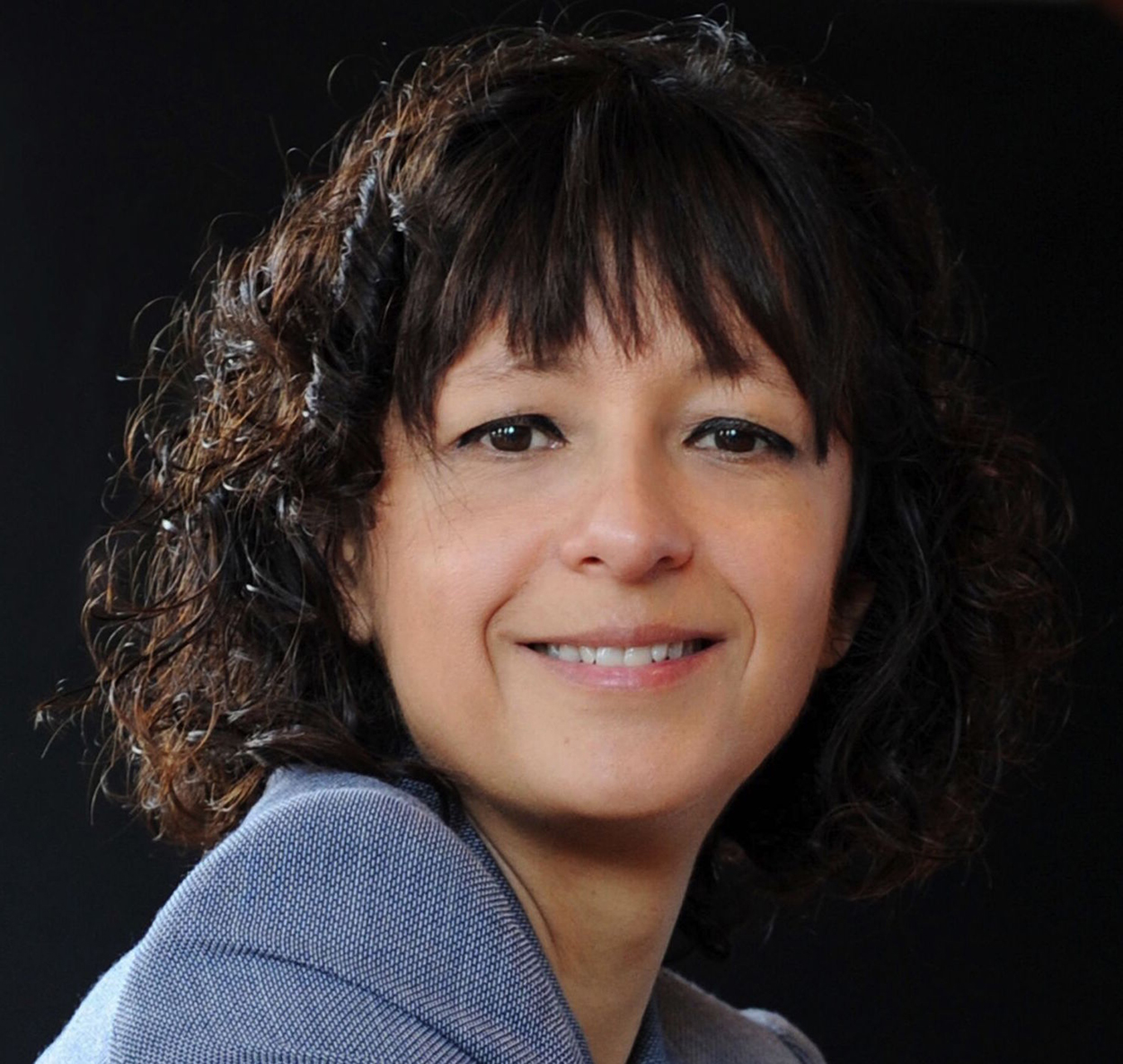
Charpentier

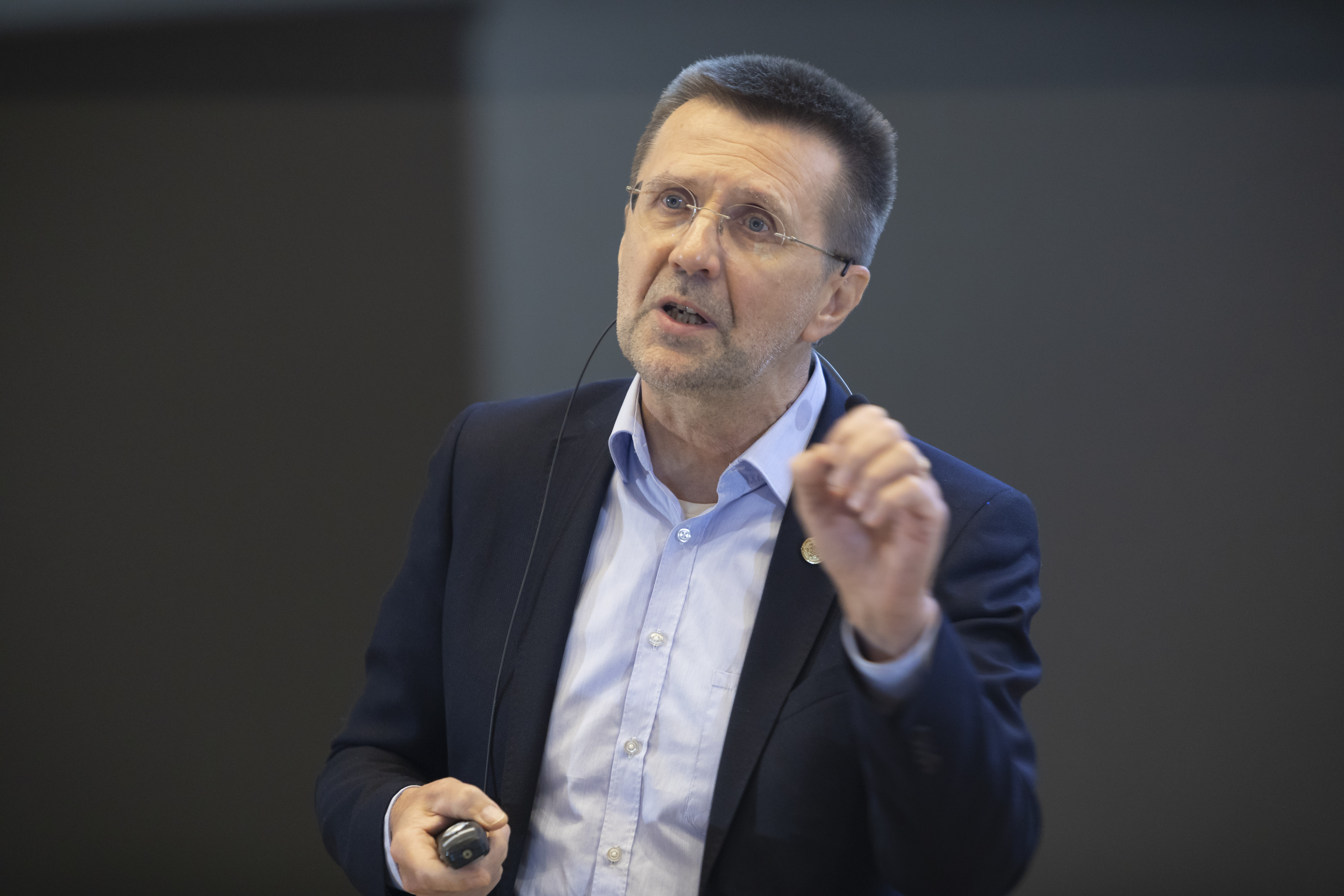
Šikšnys

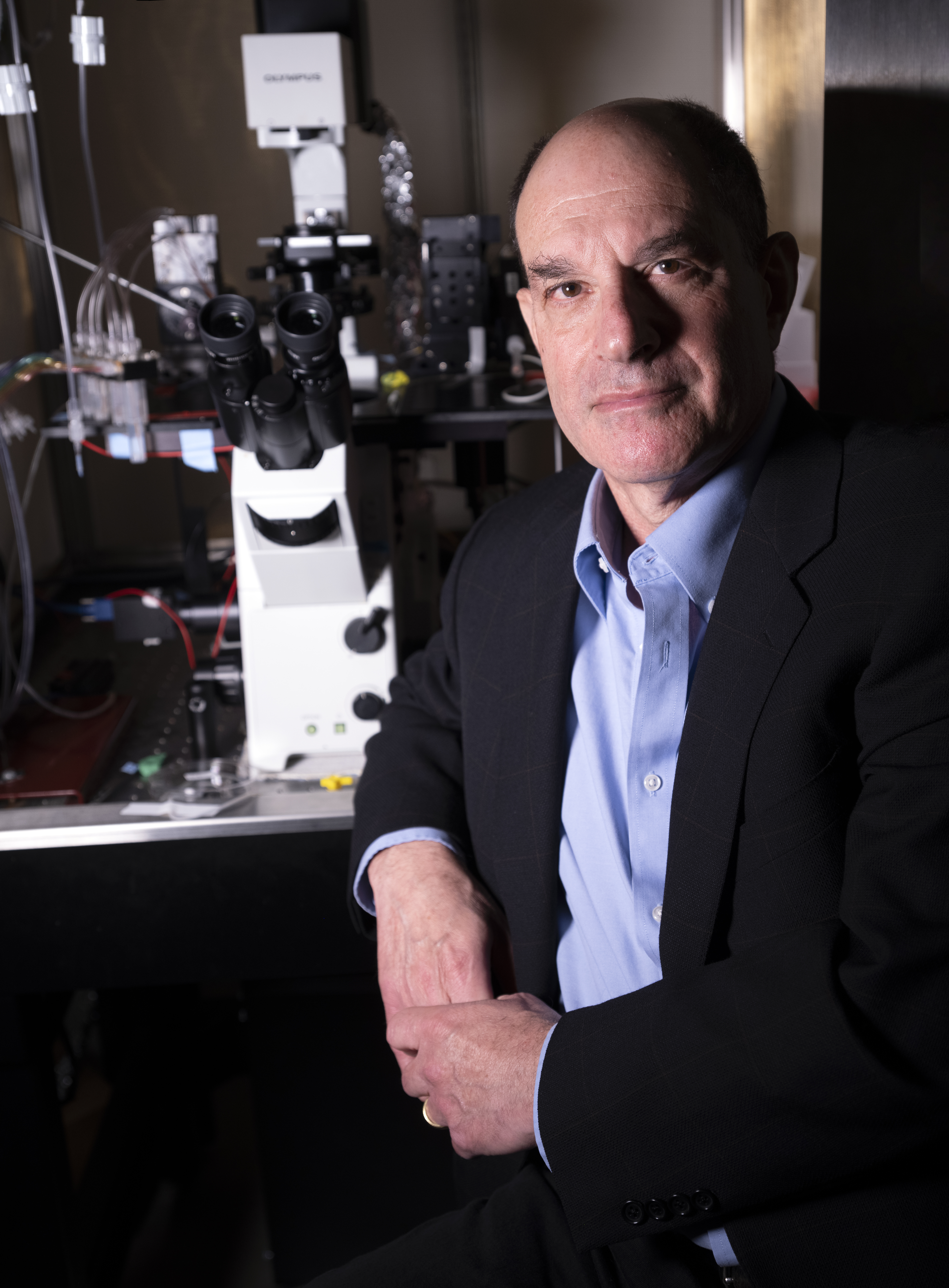
Julius

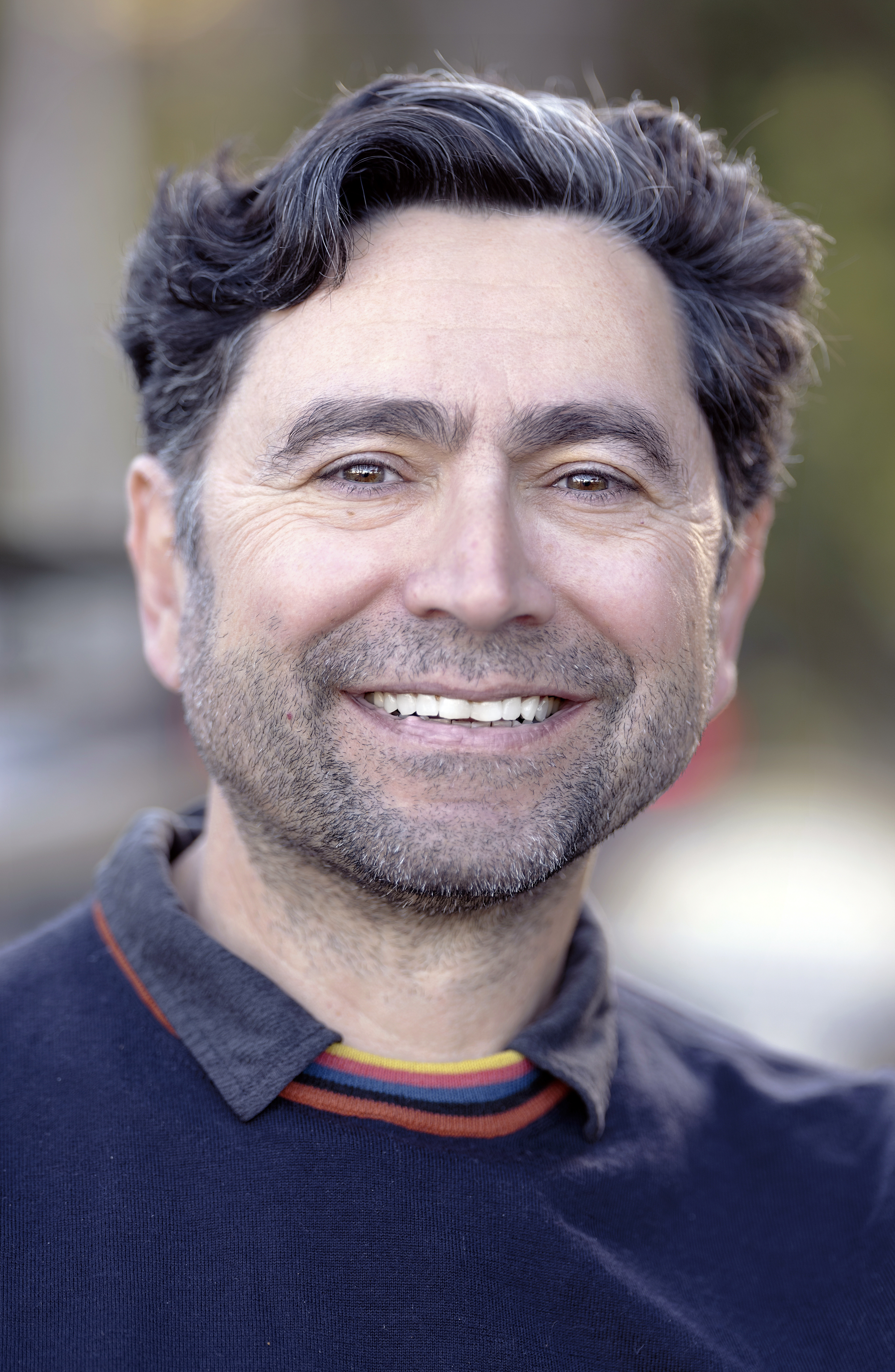
Patapoutian

- 2001: four different authors published different implementations of a distributed hash table.
- The Super Kamiokande and SNOLAB collaborations, whose findings were published in 1998 and 2001 respectively, both proved that neutrinos have mass. As a result, the 2015 Nobel Prize in Physics was shared by Takaaki Kajita of Japan and Arthur B. McDonald of Canada.
- 1996: James Allison of MD Anderson Cancer Center at the University of Texas at Houston discovered a mechanism enabling cancer immunotherapy. In 2002 Tasuku Honjo of Kyoto University discovered another such mechanism. This outcome, which led to them sharing the 2018 Nobel Prize in Physiology or Medicine, has been described as follows: "Each independently discovered that our immune system is restrained from attacking tumors by molecules that function as 'brakes.' Releasing these brakes (or 'brake receptors') allows our body to powerfully combat cancer."
- 2014: Paul Erdős' conjecture about prime gaps was proved by Kevin Ford, Ben Green, Sergei Konyagin, and Terence Tao, working together, and independently by James Maynard.
- 2020: Half of the 2020 Nobel Prize in Physics was awarded to Reinhard Genzel and Andrea Ghez, who each have led a group of astronomers focused since the early 1990s on a region at the center of the Milky Way galaxy called Sagittarius A*, finding an extremely heavy, invisible object (black hole) that pulls on a jumble of stars, causing them to rush around at dizzying speeds. Some 4 million solar masses are packed together in a region no larger than the Solar System.
- 2020 Nobel Prize in Chemistry was shared by Jennifer Doudna of the University of California, Berkeley, and Emmanuelle Charpentier of the Max Planck Institute, in Berlin. Passed over in the prize was Virginijus Šikšnys of Vilnius University, in Lithuania, though all three had shared the 2018 Kavli Prize for the same discovery of CRISPR gene editing.
- 2021 Nobel Prize in Physiology or Medicine was shared by David Julius, of the University of California, San Francisco, and Ardem Patapoutian, of Scripps Research, in La Jolla, California, a UCSF postdoctoral alumnus, for their independent discoveries of receptors for temperature and touch.
- 15 May 2025: The independent discovery of orange cats' genetic mutation appeared in Current Biology reports by a Stanford University team led by Christopher Kaelin, and by a Kyushu University team led by Hiroyuki Sasaki.

== Quotations ==
"When the time is ripe for certain things, these things appear in different places in the manner of violets coming to light in early spring."

— Farkas Bolyai to his son János Bolyai, urging him to claim the invention of non-Euclidean geometry without delay,
quoted in Ming Li and Paul Vitanyi, An introduction to Kolmogorov Complexity and Its Applications, 1st ed., 1993, p. 83.

"[Y]ou do not [make a discovery] until a background knowledge is built up to a place where it's almost impossible not to see the new thing, and it often happens that the new step is done contemporaneously in two different places in the world, independently."

— a physicist Nobel laureate interviewed by Harriet Zuckerman, in Scientific Elite: Nobel Laureates in the United States, 1977, p. 204.

"[A] man can no more be completely original ... than a tree can grow out of air."

— George Bernard Shaw, preface to Major Barbara (1905).

I never had an idea in my life. My so-called inventions already existed in the environment – I took them out. I've created nothing. Nobody does. There's no such thing as an idea being brain-born; everything comes from the outside.

— Thomas Edison

== See also ==
- Historic recurrence
- History of science
- History of technology
- List of examples of Stigler's law
- List of experiments
- List of misnamed theorems
- Matilda effect
- Matthew effect
- Moravec's paradox
- Multiple discovery
- Priority disputes
- Stigler's law of eponymy
- Synchronicity
- Timeline of historic inventions

== Sources ==
- Armitage, Angus (1951). The World of Copernicus. New York: Mentor Books.
- Isaac Asimov, Asimov's Biographical Encyclopedia of Science and Technology, second revised edition, New York, Doubleday, 1982.
- Cappi, Alberto (1994). "Edgar Allan Poe's Physical Cosmology". Quarterly Journal of the Royal Astronomical Society. 35: 177–192. Bibcode:1994QJRAS..35..177C.
- Collinge, N. E. (1985). The Laws of Indo-European. Amsterdam: John Benjamins. ISBN 978-0-915027-75-0. (U.S.), (Europe).
- Tim Folger, "The Quantum Hack: Quantum computers will render today's cryptographic methods obsolete. What happens then?" Scientific American, vol. 314, no. 2 (February 2016), pp. 48–55.
- Sarah Lewin Frasier and Jen Christiansen, "Nobel Connections: A deep dive into science's greatest prize", Scientific American, vol. 331, no. 3 (October 2024), pp. 72–73.
- Garey, Michael R.; Johnson, David S. (1979). Computers and Intractability: A Guide to the Theory of NP-Completeness. W. H. Freeman. ISBN 978-0-7167-1045-5.
- Owen Gingerich, "Did Copernicus Owe a Debt to Aristarchus?" Journal for the History of Astronomy, vol. 16, no. 1 (February 1985), pp. 37–42. 1985JHA....16...37G Page 37
- Brian Greene, "Why He [Albert Einstein] Matters: The fruits of one mind shaped civilization more than seems possible", Scientific American, vol. 313, no. 3 (September 2015), pp. 34–37.
- A. Rupert Hall, Philosophers at War, New York, Cambridge University Press, 1980.
- Lawrence M. Krauss, "What Einstein Got Wrong: Cosmology (Everyone makes mistakes. But those of the legendary physicist are particularly illuminating)", Scientific American, vol. 313, no. 3 (September 2015), pp. 50–55.
- David Lamb, Multiple Discovery: The Pattern of Scientific Progress, Amersham, Avebury Press, 1984.
- Gayoung Lee (Scientific American news intern), "This Strange Mutation Explains the Mystifying Color of Orange Cats: Your orange cat may host a never-before-seen genetic pathway for color pigmentation, according to new studies", 15 May 2025: https://www.scientificamerican.com/article/this-strange-mutation-explains-the-mystifying-color-of-orange-cats/
- David H. Levy, "My Life as a Comet Hunter: The need to pass a French test, of all things, spurred half a century of cosmic sleuthing", Scientific American, vol. 314, no. 2 (February 2016), pp. 70–71.
- Li, Ming; Vitanyi, Paul (1993). An Introduction to Kolmogorov Complexity and Its Applications, 1st ed. New York: Springer-Verlag. ISBN 978-0-387-94053-3. (U.S.), (Europe).
- Robert K. Merton, The Sociology of Science: Theoretical and Empirical Investigations, University of Chicago Press, 1973.
- Robert K. Merton, On Social Structure and Science, edited and with an introduction by Piotr Sztompka, University of Chicago Press, 1996.
- Jack Murtagh, "This Unexpected Pattern of Numbers Is Everywhere: A curious mathematical phenomenon called Benford's law governs the numbers all around us", Scientific American, vol. 329, no. 5 (December 2023), pp. 82–83.
- Ortelius, Abraham (1596) [1570]. Thesaurus Geographicus (in Latin) (3rd ed.). Antwerp: Plantin. OCLC 214324616. (First edition published 1570, 1587 edition online)
- Richard Panek, "The Cosmic Surprise: Scientists discovered dark energy 25 years ago. They're still trying to figure out what it is", Scientific American, vol. 329, no.5 (December 2023), pp. 62–71.
- Robert William Reid, Marie Curie, New York, New American Library, 1974, ISBN 0-00-211539-5.
- Marilynne Robinson, "On Edgar Allan Poe", The New York Review of Books, vol. LXII, no. 2 (5 February 2015), pp. 4, 6.
- Rombeck, Terry (22 January 2005). "Poe's little-known science book reprinted". Lawrence Journal-World & News.
- Joshua Rothman, "The Rules of the Game: How does science really work?" (review of Michael Strevens, The Knowledge Machine: How Irrationality Created Modern Science, Liveright), The New Yorker, 5 October 2020, pp. 67–71.
- Snider-Pellegrini, Antonio (1858). La Création et ses mystères dévoilés. Paris: Frank and Dentu..
- Harriet Zuckerman, Scientific Elite: Nobel Laureates in the United States, New York, Free Press, 1977.
