= Proofs from THE BOOK =

1998 mathematics book by Aigner and Ziegler

- Authors: Martin Aigner, Günter M. Ziegler
- Illustrator: Karl H. Hofmann
- Language: English
- Subject: Mathematical proofs
- Publisher: Springer
- Publication date: 1998
- Pages: 239
- ISBN: 3-540-63698-6

Proofs from THE BOOK is a book of mathematical proofs by Martin Aigner and Günter M. Ziegler, first published in 1998. The book is inspired by and named after an expression used by the mathematician Paul Erdős, who often referred to "The Book" in which God kept the best proof of each mathematical theorem. During a lecture in 1985, Erdős said, "You don't have to believe in God, but you should believe in The Book." The greatest praise Erdős gave to mathematical work was to proclaim it "straight from the Book".

Aigner and Zeigler proposed to Erdős a real book that would be "a first (and very modest) approximation to 'The Book'". Erdős had many suggestions for proofs that should be included, and would have been a co-author except that he died in 1996. Proofs from THE BOOK is instead dedicated to his memory.

Including its original publication, Proofs from THE BOOK has had six editions in English, and has been translated into Persian, French, German, Hungarian, Italian, Japanese, Chinese, Polish, Portuguese, Korean, Turkish, Russian, Spanish and Greek.

The American Mathematical Society awarded the 2018 Leroy P. Steele Prize for Mathematical Exposition to Aigner and Ziegler for this book.

== Content ==
In its most recent sixth edition, Proofs from THE BOOK contains 45 chapters grouped into five parts: number theory, geometry, analysis, combinatorics and graph theory. In most cases, each chapter is devoted to a particular theorem, sometimes with multiple proofs and related results. In a few cases, a chapter explores proofs related to a particular theme.

Aigner and Ziegler stated that they had no definite criteria for what counted as a proof from "The Book", but selected only those that would be accessible to someone with knowledge of basic undergraduate mathematics. Nevertheless some background in algebra, analysis, and topology is required to understand certain parts. Ziegler accepted that different proofs would be "perfect" for different readers.

There are differences between the various editions of the book. These are mostly additions of chapters, but some involved adding new results or new proofs for already-present results, and there was one complete deletion of a chapter. The first edition included John Leech's proof that it is impossible for thirteen unit spheres to touch a given sphere. It was removed for later editions because Aigner and Ziegler could not fill in details in a way that was "brief and elegant".

Because the book concerns beauty in mathematics, Aigner and Ziegler thought that it should have a correspondingly attractive appearance, and thus devoted a lot of time to the text and typography, and to selecting appropriate photographs and other illustrations.

The book is illustrated with drawings by Karl H. Hofmann.

== Outline ==
The outline below relates to the sixth edition. Previous editions contained fewer chapters, in some cases differently arranged.

=== Number theory ===
- Chapter 1: Six proofs of the infinity of the primes, including Euclid's and Furstenberg's.
- Chapter 2: Paul Erdős's 1932 proof of Bertrand's postulate.
- Chapter 3: Binomial coefficients are almost never powers.
- Chapter 4: Fermat's theorem on sums of two squares.
- Chapter 5: Two proofs of the law of quadratic reciprocity.
- Chapter 6: Proof of Wedderburn's little theorem asserting that every finite division ring is a field.
- Chapter 7: The spectral theorem, Hadamard's maximal determinant problem and Hadamard's inequality.
- Chapter 8: Some irrational numbers, including Ivan Niven's proof that $\pi$ (pi) is irrational.
- Chapter 9: Four proofs of the solution to Basel problem, namely that $\sum_{n \geq 1}^\infty \frac{1}{n^2} = \frac{\pi^2}{6}$.

=== Geometry ===
- Chapter 10: Hilbert's third problem.
- Chapter 11: Lines in the plane, including the Sylvester–Gallai theorem and the De Bruijn–Erdős theorem.
- Chapter 12: The slope problem.
- Chapter 13: Applications of Euler's formula.
- Chapter 14: Cauchy's rigidity theorem.
- Chapter 15: The non-existence of the Borromean rings.
- Chapter 16: Touching simplices.
- Chapter 17: Large angles in point sets.
- Chapter 18: Borsuk's conjecture.
- Chapter 19: The Schröder–Bernstein theorem and Wetzel's problem on families of analytic functions with few distinct values.

=== Analysis ===
- Chapter 21: The fundamental theorem of algebra.
- Chapter 22: Monsky's theorem.
- Chapter 23: A theorem of George Pólya on polynomials.
- Chapter 24: Van der Waerden's conjecture.
- Chapter 25: Littlewood–Offord lemma.
- Chapter 26: The cotangent and Herglotz's trick.
- Chapter 27: Buffon's needle problem.

=== Combinatorics ===
- Chapter 28: Pigeonhole principle and double counting, Sperner's lemma.
- Chapter 29: Results on tiling rectangles due to Nicolaas Govert de Bruijn and Max Dehn.
- Chapter 30: Sperner's theorem, Erdős–Ko–Rado theorem and Hall's theorem
- Chapter 31: Shuffling cards.
- Chapter 32: Lattice paths and determinants, including Lindström–Gessel–Viennot lemma and the Cauchy–Binet formula.
- Chapter 33: Four proofs of Cayley's formula.
- Chapter 34: Identities versus bijections.
- Chapter 35: Kakeya sets in vector spaces over finite fields.

=== Graph Theory ===
- Chapter 37: The Bregman–Minc inequality.
- Chapter 38: The Dinitz problem.
- Chapter 39: The five color theorem.
- Chapter 40: Steve Fisk's proof of the art gallery theorem.
- Chapter 41: Five proofs of Turán's theorem.
- Chapter 42: Shannon capacity and Lovász number.
- Chapter 43: Chromatic number of Kneser graphs.
- Chapter 44: Friendship theorem.
- Chapter 45: Some proofs using the probabilistic method.
