= Karl H. Hofmann =

German mathematician

Karl Heinrich Hofmann
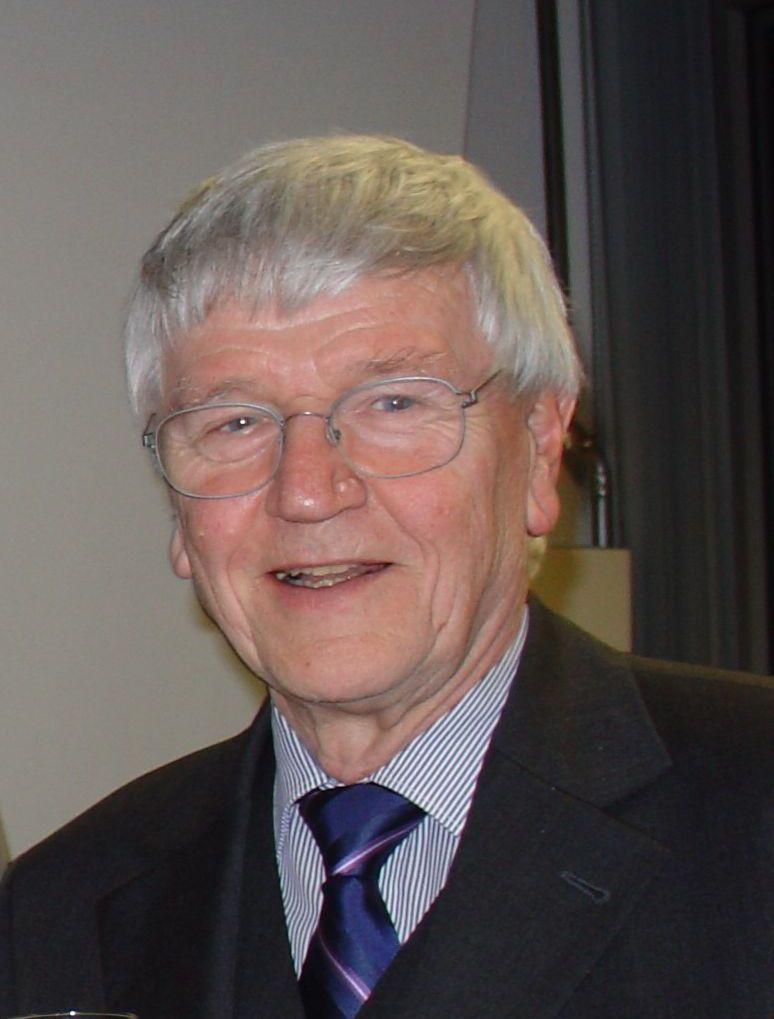
- Born: October 3, 1932 (age 93); Heilbronn, Germany

Academic background
- Education: University of Tübingen (Ph.D)
- Doctoral advisor: Hellmuth Kneser

Academic work
- Notable students: Karl-Hermann Neeb

Karl Heinrich Hofmann (born 3 October 1932), known professionally as Karl H. Hofmann is a German mathematician and illustrator who is professor emeritus at the Technical University of Darmstadt (TU Darmstadt). His research is primarily focused on topological algebra and functional analysis.

== Education ==
Hofmann began his first mathematics degree at the University of Hamburg but transferred to the University of Tübingen and completed it there. He remained in Tübingen for his master's degree and Ph.D. which was completed in 1958 under supervisor Hellmuth Kneser.

== Career ==
Most of Hofmann's work is in lie theory and topological analysis. His book with Sidney Morris, The Structure of Compact Groups, has been printed in four editions and is a standard reference for the subject.

The University of Tübingen hired Hofmann as an assistant professor following the completion of his Ph.D. in 1958. He remained at Tübingen until 1963 where he became an associate professor at Tulane University. He became a full professor two years later an in 1979 the university appointed him as W. R. Irby Professor of Mathematics. Hofmann supervised 37 doctoral students throughout his fifty-year career. In 2013, Hofmann was inducted as a fellow of the American Mathematical Society.

Alongside his academic career, Hofmann worked as an illustrator. He illustrated multiple books, including Proofs from THE BOOK, a Leroy P. Steele Prize winner. He has also created posters for TU Darmstadt's colloquiums since 1983.

== Selected publications ==
- Hofmann, Karl H. (2020). The Structure of Compact Groups: A Primer for the Student - a Handbook for the Expert (4th ed.). Berlin/Boston: Walter de Gruyter GmbH. doi:10.1515/9783110695991. ISBN 9783110695991.
- Gierz, Gerhard; Hofmann, Karl Heinrich; Keimel, Klaus; Lawson, Jimmie D.; Mislove, Michael W.; Scott, Dana S. (1980). A Compendium of Continuous Lattices. Berlin, Heidelberg: Springer Berlin Heidelberg. doi:10.1007/978-3-642-67678-9. ISBN 978-3-642-67680-2.
- Aigner, Martin; Ziegler, Günter M. (2018). Proofs from THE BOOK (6 ed.). Springer. pp. i–viii. doi:10.1007/978-3-662-57265-8. ISBN 978-3-662-57265-8. Illustrated by Karl H. Hofmann.
