= Block walking =

Mathematical technique

In combinatorial mathematics, block walking is a method useful in thinking about sums of combinations graphically as "walks" on Pascal's triangle. As the name suggests, block walking problems involve counting the number of ways an individual can walk from one corner A of a city block to another corner B of another city block given restrictions on the number of blocks the person may walk, the directions the person may travel, the distance from A to B, et cetera.

== An example block walking problem ==
Suppose such an individual, say "Fred", must walk exactly k blocks to get to a point B that is exactly k blocks from A. It is convenient to regard Fred's starting point A as the origin, (0,0), of a rectangular array of lattice points and B as some lattice point $(e,n)$, e units "East" and n units "North" of A, where $e+n=k$ and both e and n are nonnegative.

=== Solution by brute force ===
A "brute force" solution to this problem may be obtained by systematically counting the number of ways Fred can reach each point $X=(x_1,x_2)$ where

$0 \le x_1 \le e$ and $0 \le x_{2} \le n$

without backtracking (i.e. only traveling North or East from one point to another) until a pattern is observed. For example, the number of ways Fred could go from (0,0) to (1,0) or (0,1) is exactly one; to (1,1) is two; to (2,0) or (0,2) is one; to (1,2) or (2,1) is three; and so on. Actually, you could receive the number of ways to get to a particular point by adding up the number of ways you can get to the point south of it and the number of ways you can get to the point west of it.(With the starting point being zero and all the points directly north and south of it one.) In general, one soon discovers that the number of paths from A to any such X corresponds to an entry of Pascal's triangle.

=== Combinatorial solution ===
Since the problem involves counting a finite, discrete number of paths between lattice points, it is reasonable to assume a combinatorial solution exists to the problem. Towards this end, we note that for Fred to still be on a path that will take him from A to B over k blocks, at any point X he must either travel along one of the unit vectors ⟨1,0⟩ and ⟨0,1⟩. For the sake of clarity, let $E=\langle 1,0 \rangle$ and $N=\langle 0,1\rangle$. Given the coordinates of B, regardless of the path Fred travels he must walk along the vectors E and N exactly e and n times, respectively. As such, the problem reduces to finding the number of distinct rearrangements of the word

$$\overbrace{ EE \cdots E }^{e\text{ times}}\underbrace{ NN \cdots N }_{n \text{ times}}$$,

which is equivalent to finding the number of ways to choose e indistinct objects from a group of k. Thus the total number of paths Fred could take from A to B traveling only k blocks is

$$\binom{k}{e}=\binom{k}{n}=\frac{k!}{e! n!}.$$

== Other problems with known block walking combinatorial proofs ==
- Proving that

$$\sum_{k=0}^n { n \choose k}^2\ = { 2n \choose n}$$

can be done with a straightforward application of block walking.

== See also ==
- Lattice path
