= Delannoy number =

Number of paths between grid corners, allowing diagonal steps

- Named after: Henri–Auguste Delannoy
- No. of known terms: infinity
- Formula: $D(m,n) = \sum_{k=0}^{\min(m,n)} \binom{m}{k} \binom{n}{k} 2^k$
- OEIS index: A008288; Square array of Delannoy

In mathematics, a Delannoy number $D$ counts the paths from the southwest corner (0, 0) of a rectangular grid to the northeast corner (m, n), using only single steps north, northeast, or east. The Delannoy numbers are named after French army officer and amateur mathematician Henri Delannoy.

The Delannoy number $D(m,n)$ also counts the global alignments of two sequences of lengths $m$ and $n$, the points in an m-dimensional integer lattice or cross polytope which are at most n steps from the origin, and, in cellular automata, the cells in an m-dimensional von Neumann neighborhood of radius n.

== Example ==
The Delannoy number D(3, 3) equals 63. The following figure illustrates the 63 Delannoy paths from (0, 0) to (3, 3):

The subset of paths that do not rise above the SW–NE diagonal are counted by a related family of numbers, the Schröder numbers.

== Delannoy array ==
The Delannoy array is an infinite matrix of the Delannoy numbers:

m n	0	1	2	3	4	5	6	7	8
0	1	1	1	1	1	1	1	1	1
1	1	3	5	7	9	11	13	15	17
2	1	5	13	25	41	61	85	113	145
3	1	7	25	63	129	231	377	575	833
4	1	9	41	129	321	681	1289	2241	3649
5	1	11	61	231	681	1683	3653	7183	13073
6	1	13	85	377	1289	3653	8989	19825	40081
7	1	15	113	575	2241	7183	19825	48639	108545
8	1	17	145	833	3649	13073	40081	108545	265729
9	1	19	181	1159	5641	22363	75517	224143	598417

In this array, the numbers in the first row are all one, the numbers in the second row are the odd numbers, the numbers in the third row are the centered square numbers, and the numbers in the fourth row are the centered octahedral numbers. Alternatively, the same numbers can be arranged in a triangular array resembling Pascal's triangle, also called the tribonacci triangle, in which each number is the sum of the three numbers above it:

            1
          1   1
        1   3   1
      1   5   5   1
    1   7  13   7   1
  1   9  25  25   9   1
1  11  41  63  41  11   1

The row sums of the triangle give successive Pell numbers 1, 2, 5, 12, 29, 70, 169,... the sums of the rising diagonals give the tribonacci numbers 1, 1, 2, 4, 7, 13, 24,...

== Central Delannoy numbers ==
The central Delannoy numbers D(n) = D(n, n) are the numbers for a square n × n grid. The first few central Delannoy numbers (starting with n = 0) are:

1, 3, 13, 63, 321, 1683, 8989, 48639, 265729, ... (sequence A001850 in the OEIS).

== Computation ==
=== Delannoy numbers ===
For $k$ diagonal (i.e. northeast) steps, there must be $m-k$ steps in the $x$ direction and $n-k$ steps in the $y$ direction in order to reach the point $(m, n)$; as these steps can be performed in any order, the number of such paths is given by the multinomial coefficient $\binom{m+n-k}{k , m-k , n-k} = \binom{m+n-k}{m} \binom{m}{k}$. Hence, one gets the closed-form expression

$$D(m,n) = \sum_{k=0}^{\min(m,n)} \binom{m+n-k}{m} \binom{m}{k} .$$

An alternative expression is given by

$$D(m,n) = \sum_{k=0}^{\min(m,n)} \binom{m}{k} \binom{n}{k} 2^k$$

or by the infinite series

$$D(m,n) = \sum_{k=0}^\infty \frac{1}{2^{k+1}} \binom{k}{n} \binom{k}{m}.$$

And also

$$D(m,n) = \sum_{k=0}^{n} A(m,k),$$

where $A(m,k)$ is given with (sequence A266213 in the OEIS).

The basic recurrence relation for the Delannoy numbers is easily seen to be

$$D(m,n)=\begin{cases}1 &\text{if }m=0\text{ or }n=0\\D(m-1,n) + D(m-1,n-1) + D(m,n-1)&\text{otherwise}\end{cases}$$

This recurrence relation also leads directly to the generating function

$$\sum_{m,n = 0}^\infty D(m, n) x^m y^n = (1 - x - y - xy)^{-1} .$$

=== Central Delannoy numbers ===
Substituting $m = n$ in the first closed form expression above, replacing $k \leftrightarrow n-k$, and a little algebra, gives

$$D(n) = \sum_{k=0}^n \binom{n}{k} \binom{n+k}{k} ,$$

while the second expression above yields

$$D(n) = \sum_{k=0}^n \binom{n}{k}^2 2^k .$$

The central Delannoy numbers satisfy also a three-term recurrence relationship among themselves,

$$n D(n) = 3(2n-1)D(n-1) - (n-1)D(n-2) ,$$

and have a generating function

$$\sum_{n = 0}^\infty D(n) x^n = (1-6x+x^2)^{-1/2} .$$

The leading asymptotic behavior of the central Delannoy numbers is given by

$$D(n) = \frac{c \, \alpha^n}{\sqrt{n}} \, (1 + O(n^{-1}))$$

where $\alpha = 3 + 2 \sqrt{2} \approx 5.828$ and $c = (4 \pi (3 \sqrt{2} - 4))^{-1/2} \approx 0.5727$.

== See also ==
- Motzkin number
- Narayana number
- Schroder-Hipparchus number
- Schroder number
