= Sidney Morris =

Retired Australian mathematics professor

Sidney Allen Morris
- Born: 1947 (age 78–79); Brisbane, Australia
- Title: Emeritus Professor
- Awards: Lester R. Ford Award (MAA); Outstanding Service Award (ACS)

Academic background
- Education: Flinders University
- Thesis: Varieties of Topological Groups (1970)
- Doctoral advisor: Igor Kluvanek

Academic work
- Discipline: Mathematics, information technology
- Sub-discipline: Topological groups
- Institutions: La Trobe University (1976-1988); University of New England (1988-1991); University of Wollongong (1991-1997); University of South Australia (1997-2001); Federation University Australia (2001-present)
- Website: www.sidneymorris.net

Sidney "Sid" Morris (born 1947) is an Emeritus Professor at Federation University Australia who worked in the fields of mathematics and information technology. Before his retirement in 2010, he was a professor at several universities and received the 1987 Lester R. Ford award from the Mathematical Association of America. Morris is a fellow and former vice-president of the Australian Mathematical Society (AMS).

== Education ==
Morris earned a BSc in 1969 from the University of Queensland, Australia and one year later completed a Ph.D. at Flinders University. His dissertation, completed under the supervision of Igor Kluvanek, defined the concept of "variety" among topological groups and proved a result similar to the Stone–Čech compactification.

== Career ==
During his first senior position at La Trobe University, Morris began as an editor for the Bulletin of the Australian Mathematical Society. He then became editor-in-chief of the Australian Mathematical Society Lecture Series, a series published by Cambridge University Press.

In 1987, Morris received the Lester R. Ford award from the Mathematical Association of America for the article Numerical Geometry – Numbers for Shapes.

Morris published his first book The Structure of Compact Groups in 1998 with Karl Heinrich Hofmann. He, along with Arthur Jones and Kenneth R. Pearson, published Abstract Algebra and Famous Impossibilities in 2022 as part of Springer's Undergraduate Texts in Mathematics series.

Although he is retired, Morris remains an editor for the AMS's Gazette and MDPI's Internation Journal of Topology. He continues to maintain his online book Topology Without Tears, which was initially published in 1985.

== Personal life ==
Sidney Morris received his rabbinical ordination in 2016 at the age of 68. He has been married to his wife, Elizabeth, for over fifty years.

== Selected publications ==
- Hofmann, Karl H.; Morris, Sidney A. (1998). The structure of compact groups: a primer for the student a handbook for the expert. Berlin New York: W. De Gruyter. ISBN 3-11-015268-1.
- Morris, Sidney A. (2009). Pontryagin duality and the structure of locally compact abelian groups. Cambridge: Cambridge University Press. ISBN 9780521215435.
- Hofmann, Karl H.; Morris, Sidney A. (2007). The Lie theory of connected pro-Lie groups. Zürich: European mathematical society. ISBN 978-3-03719-032-6.
