= 54 (number) =

← 53	54	55 →
- ← 50 51 52 53 54 55 56 57 58 59 →: List of numbers; Integers; ← 0 10 20 30 40 50 60 70 80 90 →
- Cardinal: fifty-four
- Ordinal: 54th (fifty-fourth)
- Factorization: 2 × 3^{3}
- Divisors: 1, 2, 3, 6, 9, 18, 27, 54
- Greek numeral: ΝΔ´
- Roman numeral: LIV, liv
- Binary: 110110_{2}
- Ternary: 2000_{3}
- Senary: 130_{6}
- Octal: 66_{8}
- Duodecimal: 46_{12}
- Hexadecimal: 36_{16}
- Eastern Arabic, Kurdish, Persian, Sindhi: ٥٤
- Assamese & Bengali: ৫৪
- Chinese numeral, Japanese numeral: 五十四
- Devanāgarī: ५४
- Ge'ez: ፶፬
- Georgian: ნდ
- Hebrew: נ"ד
- Kannada: ೫೪
- Khmer: ៥៤
- Armenian: ԾԴ
- Malayalam: ൫൰൪
- Meitei: ꯵꯴
- Thai: ๕๔
- Telugu: ౫౪
- Babylonian numeral: 𒐐𒐘
- Egyptian hieroglyph: 𓎊𓏽
- Mayan numeral: 𝋢𝋮
- Urdu numerals: ۵۴
- Tibetan numerals: ༥༤
- Financial kanji/hanja: 五拾四, 伍拾肆
- Morse code: ........._
- NATO phonetic alphabet: FIFE FOW-ER
- ASCII value: 6

54 (fifty-four) is the natural number and positive integer following 53 and preceding 55. As a multiple of 2 but not of 4, 54 is an oddly even number and a composite number.

54 is related to the golden ratio through trigonometry: the sine of a 54 degree angle is half of the golden ratio. Also, 54 is a regular number, and its even division of powers of 60 was useful to ancient mathematicians who used the Assyro-Babylonian mathematics system.

== In mathematics ==
=== Number theory ===
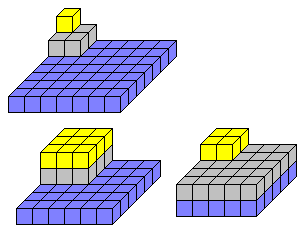
54 as the sum of three positive squares

54 is an abundant number because the sum of its proper divisors (66), is greater than itself. Like all multiples of 6, 54 is equal to some of its proper divisors summed together, (Note: 54 can be expressed as: 9 + 18 + 27 = 54.) so it is also a semiperfect number. These proper divisors can be summed in various ways to express all positive integers smaller than 54, so 54 is a practical number as well. Additionally, as an integer for which the arithmetic mean of all its positive divisors (including itself) is also an integer, 54 is an arithmetic number.

=== Trigonometry and the golden ratio ===
If the complementary angle of a triangle's corner is 54 degrees, the sine of that angle is half the golden ratio. This is because the corresponding interior angle is equal to π/5 radians (or 36 degrees). (Note: There are various ways to prove this, but the algebraic method will eventually show that $\sin{54} = \cos{\frac{\pi}{5}} = \frac{2\sqrt{5}}{4} = \frac{\phi}{2}$.) If that triangle is isoceles, the relationship with the golden ratio makes it a golden triangle. The golden triangle is most readily found as the spikes on a regular pentagram.

=== Regular number used in Assyro-Babylonian mathematics ===
As a regular number, 54 is a divisor of many powers of 60. (Note: 60^{3} and its multiples are divisible by 54.) This is an important property in Assyro-Babylonian mathematics because that system uses a sexagesimal (base-60) number system. In base 60, the reciprocal of a regular number has a finite representation. Babylonian computers kept tables of these reciprocals to make their work more efficient. Using regular numbers simplifies multiplication and division in base 60 because dividing a by b can be done by multiplying a by b's reciprocal when b is a regular number.

For instance, division by 54 can be achieved in the Assyro-Babylonian system by multiplying by 4000 because 60^{3} ÷ 54 = 60^{3} × (1/54) = 4000. In base 60, 4000 can be written as 1:6:40. (Note: 1:6:40 = 1×60^{2} + 6×60^{1} + 40×60^{0} = 4000. This is the number written in Babylonian numerals: 𒐕𒐚𒐏.) Because the Assyro-Babylonian system does not have a symbol separating the fractional and integer parts of a number and does not have the concept of 0 as a number, it does not specify the power of the starting digit. Accordingly, 1/54 can also be written as 1:6:40. (Note: 1:6:40 = 1×60^{-1} + 6×60^{-2} + 40×60^{-3} = 1/54. This is the number written in Babylonian numerals: 𒐕𒐚𒐏.) Therefore, the result of multiplication by 1:6:40 (4000) has the same Assyro-Babylonian representation as the result of multiplication by 1:6:40 (1/54). To convert from the former to the latter, the result's representation is interpreted as a number shifted three base-60 places to the right, reducing it by a factor of 60^{3}. (Note: For example, 6534 ÷ 54 = 121. The Assyro-Babylonian method is to calculate 6534 × 4000 = 26136000. This result can be written in Babylonian numerals as 𒐖𒐕 (2:1), meaning 2×60^{4} + 1×60^{3}. To complete the division by 54, one must divide by 60^{3}. Shifting the numeral three base-60 digits to the right divides the number by 60^{3}, so 𒐖𒐕 (2:1) is already the answer: 2×60^{1} + 1×60^{0} = 121.)

=== Graph theory ===
The Ellingham–Horton 54-graph

The second Ellingham–Horton graph was published by Mark N. Ellingham and Joseph D. Horton in 1983; it is of order 54. These graphs provided further counterexamples to the conjecture of W. T. Tutte that every cubic 3-connected bipartite graph is Hamiltonian. Horton disproved the conjecture some years earlier with the Horton graph, but that was larger at 92 vertices. The smallest known counter-example is now 50 vertices.

== In literature ==
In The Hitchhiker's Guide to the Galaxy by Douglas Adams, the "Answer to the Ultimate Question of Life, the Universe, and Everything" famously was 42. Eventually, one character's unsuccessful attempt to divine the Ultimate Question elicited "What do you get if you multiply six by nine?" The mathematical answer was 54, not 42. Some readers who were trying to find a deeper meaning in the passage soon noticed the fact was true in base 13: the base-10 expression 54_{10} can be encoded as the base-13 expression 6_{13} × 9_{13} = 42_{13}. Adams said this was a coincidence.

== List of basic calculations ==
Multiplication	1	2	3	4	5	6	7	8	9	10	11	12	13	14	15
54 × x	54	108	162	216	270	324	378	432	486	540	594	648	702	756	810

Division	1	2	3	4	5	6	7	8	9	10
54 ÷ x	54	27	18	13.5	10.8	9	7.7̅1̅4̅2̅8̅5̅	6.75	6	5.4
x ÷ 54	0.01̅8̅5̅	0.0̅3̅7̅	0.05̅	0.0̅7̅4̅	0.09̅2̅5̅	0.1̅	0.12̅9̅6̅	0.1̅4̅8̅	0.16̅	0.1̅8̅5̅

Exponentiation	1	2	3
54^{x}	54	2916	157464
x^{54}	1	18014398509481984	58149737003040059690390169
$\sqrt[x]{54}$	54	7.34846... (Note: Because 54 is a multiple of 2 but not a square number, its square root is irrational.)	3.77976...

== Explanatory footnotes ==
Genji-mon, the traditional symbols that represent the fifty-four chapters of The Tale of Genji
