= 50 (number) =

← 49	50	51 →
- ← 50 51 52 53 54 55 56 57 58 59 →: List of numbers; Integers; ← 0 10 20 30 40 50 60 70 80 90 →
- Cardinal: fifty
- Ordinal: 50th (fiftieth)
- Numeral system: quinquagesimal
- Factorization: 2 × 5^{2}
- Divisors: 1, 2, 5, 10, 25, 50
- Greek numeral: Ν´
- Roman numeral: L, l
- Unicode symbol: ↆ
- Binary: 110010_{2}
- Ternary: 1212_{3}
- Senary: 122_{6}
- Octal: 62_{8}
- Duodecimal: 42_{12}
- Hexadecimal: 32_{16}
- Armenian: Ծ
- Hebrew: נ / ן
- Babylonian numeral: 𒐐
- Egyptian hieroglyph: 𓎊

50 (fifty) is the natural number following 49 and preceding 51.

== In mathematics ==
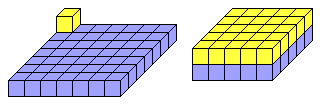
50 as the sum of two non-zero squares

Fifty is the smallest number that is the sum of two non-zero square numbers in two distinct ways. 50 is an unsigned Stirling number of the first kind and a Narayana number.

== In science ==
Fifty is the fifth magic number in nuclear physics, corresponding to the element tin.

== In religion ==
In Hindu tantric tradition, the number 50 holds significance as the 50 Rudras in the Malinīvijayottara correlate with the 50 phonemes of Sanskrit, as well as with the 50 severed heads worn around goddess Kali's head. The mantra Aham ("I am"), as laid out in the Vijñāna Bhairava represents the first अ(a) and last ह(ha) phonemes of the Sanskrit alphabet and is believed to represent ultimate reality, in accordance with its non-dual philosophy.

== In other fields ==
The percentage (50%) equivalent to one half, so that the phrase "fifty-fifty" commonly expresses something divided equally in two; in business this is often denoted as being the ultimate in equal partnership

Fifty years of marriage is marked by the gold or "golden" wedding anniversary.

The United States contains 50 States.
