= Central binomial coefficient =

Sequence of numbers ((2n) choose (n))

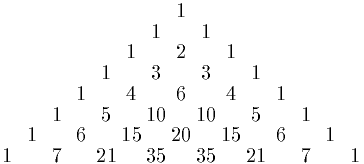
Pascal's triangle, rows 0 through 7. The numbers in the central column are the central binomial coefficients.

In mathematics the nth central binomial coefficient is the particular binomial coefficient

$${2n \choose n} = \frac{(2n)!}{(n!)^2} \text{ for all }n \geq 0.$$

They are called central since they show up exactly in the middle of the even-numbered rows in Pascal's triangle. The first few central binomial coefficients starting at n = 0 are:

1, 2, 6, 20, 70, 252, 924, 3432, 12870, 48620, ...; (sequence A000984 in the OEIS)

== Combinatorial interpretations and other properties ==
The central binomial coefficients give the number of possible number of assignments of n-a-side sports teams from 2n players, taking into account the playing area side

The central binomial coefficient $\binom{2n}{n}$ is the number of arrangements where there are an equal number of two types of objects. For example, when $n=2$, the binomial coefficient $\binom{2 \cdot 2}{2}$ is equal to 6, and there are six arrangements of two copies of A and two copies of B: AABB, ABAB, ABBA, BAAB, BABA, BBAA.

The same central binomial coefficient $\binom{2n}{n}$ is also the number of words of length 2n made up of A and B within which, as one reads from left to right, there are never more B's than A's at any point. For example, when $n=2$, there are six words of length 4 in which each prefix has at least as many copies of A as of B: AAAA, AAAB, AABA, AABB, ABAA, ABAB.

The number of factors of 2 in $\binom{2n}{n}$ is equal to the number of 1s in the binary representation of n. As a consequence, 1 is the only odd central binomial coefficient.

== Generating function ==
The ordinary generating function for the central binomial coefficients is
$$\frac{1}{\sqrt{1-4x}} = \sum_{n=0}^\infty \binom{2n}{n} x^n = 1 + 2x + 6x^2 + 20x^3 + 70x^4 + 252x^5 + \cdots.$$
This can be proved using the binomial series and the relation
$$\binom{2n}{n} = (-1)^n 4^n \binom{-1/2}{n},$$
where $\textstyle\binom{-1/2}{n}$ is a generalized binomial coefficient.

The central binomial coefficients have exponential generating function
$$\sum_{n=0}^\infty \binom{2n}{n}\frac{x^n}{n!} = e^{2x} I_0(2x),$$
where I_{0} is a modified Bessel function of the first kind.

The generating function of the squares of the central binomial coefficients can be written in terms of the complete elliptic integral of the first kind:

$$\sum_{n=0}^{\infty} \binom{2n}{n}^2 x^{n} = \frac{2}{\pi}K(4\sqrt{x}).$$

== Asymptotic growth ==
The asymptotic behavior can be described quite accurately:
$${2n \choose n} = \frac{4^n}{\sqrt{\pi n}}\left(1-\frac{1}{8n}+\frac{1}{128 n^2}+\frac{5}{1024 n^3} + O(n^{-4})\right).$$

== Related sequences ==
The closely related Catalan numbers C_{n} are given by:

$$C_n = \frac{1}{n+1} {2n \choose n} = {2n \choose n} -
{2n \choose n+1}\text{ for all }n \geq 0.$$

A slight generalization of central binomial coefficients is to take them as $\frac{\Gamma(2n+1)}{\Gamma(n+1)^2}=\frac{1}{n \Beta(n+1,n)}$, with appropriate real numbers n, where $\Gamma(x)$ is the gamma function and $\Beta(x,y)$ is the beta function.

The powers of two that divide the central binomial coefficients are given by Gould's sequence, whose nth element is the number of odd integers in row n of Pascal's triangle.

Squaring the generating function gives
$$\frac{1}{1-4x} = \left(\sum_{n=0}^\infty \binom{2n}{n} x^n\right)\left(\sum_{n=0}^\infty \binom{2n}{n} x^n\right).$$
Comparing the coefficients of $x^n$ gives
$$\sum_{k=0}^n \binom{2k}{k}\binom{2n-2k}{n-k} = 4^n.$$
For example, $64=1(20)+2(6)+6(2)+20(1)$ (sequence A000302 in the OEIS).

The number lattice paths of length 2n that consist of steps of unit length in one of the four cardinal directions and start and end at the origin is
$$\sum_{k=0}^n \binom{2k}{k}\binom{2n-2k}{n-k}\binom{2n}{2k} = \binom{2n}{n}\sum_{k=0}^n \binom{n}{k}^2 = \binom{2n}{n}^2$$
(sequence A002894 in the OEIS).

== Properties ==
Half the central binomial coefficient $\textstyle\frac12{2n \choose n} = {2n-1 \choose n-1}$ (for $n>0$) (sequence A001700 in the OEIS) is seen in Wolstenholme's theorem.

By the Erdős squarefree conjecture, proved in 1996, no central binomial coefficient with n > 4 is squarefree.

$\textstyle \binom{2n}{n}$ is the sum of the squares of the n-th row of Pascal's Triangle:

$${2n \choose n}=\sum_{k=0}^n \binom{n}{k}^2$$

For example, $\tbinom{6}{3}=20=1^2+3^2+3^2+1^2$.

Erdős uses central binomial coefficients extensively in his proof of Bertrand's postulate.

Another noteworthy fact is that the power of 2 dividing $(n+1)\dots(2n)$ is exactly n.

== See also ==
- Central trinomial coefficient
