= Wetzel's problem =

In mathematics, Wetzel's problem concerns bounds on the cardinality of a set of analytic functions that, for each of their arguments, take on few distinct values. It is named after John Wetzel, a mathematician at the University of Illinois at Urbana–Champaign.

Let F be a family of distinct analytic functions on a given domain with the property that, for each x in the domain, the functions in F map x to a countable set of values. In his doctoral dissertation, Wetzel asked whether this assumption implies that F is necessarily itself countable. Paul Erdős in turn learned about the problem at the University of Michigan, likely via Lee Albert Rubel. In his paper on the problem, Erdős credited an anonymous mathematician with the observation that, when each x is mapped to a finite set of values, F is necessarily finite.

However, as Erdős showed, the situation for countable sets is more complicated: the answer to Wetzel's question is yes if and only if the continuum hypothesis is false. That is, the existence of an uncountable set of functions that maps each argument x to a countable set of values is equivalent to the nonexistence of an uncountable set of real numbers whose cardinality is less than the cardinality of the set of all real numbers. One direction of this equivalence was also proven independently, but not published, by another UIUC mathematician, Robert Dan Dixon. It follows from the independence of the continuum hypothesis, proved in 1963 by Paul Cohen, that the answer to Wetzel's problem is independent of ZFC set theory. Erdős' proof is so short and elegant that it is considered to be one of the Proofs from THE BOOK.

In the case that the continuum hypothesis is false, Erdős asked whether there is a family of analytic functions, with the cardinality of the continuum, such that each complex number has a smaller-than-continuum set of images. As Ashutosh Kumar and Saharon Shelah later proved, both positive and negative answers to this question are consistent.
