= 58 (number) =

← 57	58	59 →
- ← 50 51 52 53 54 55 56 57 58 59 →: List of numbers; Integers; ← 0 10 20 30 40 50 60 70 80 90 →
- Cardinal: fifty-eight
- Ordinal: 58th (fifty-eighth)
- Factorization: 2 × 29
- Divisors: 1, 2, 29, 58
- Greek numeral: ΝΗ´
- Roman numeral: LVIII, lviii
- Binary: 111010_{2}
- Ternary: 2011_{3}
- Senary: 134_{6}
- Octal: 72_{8}
- Duodecimal: 4A_{12}
- Hexadecimal: 3A_{16}

58 (fifty-eight) is the natural number following 57 and preceding 59.

== In mathematics ==
58 is a composite number, a semiprime, and a square-free integer.

58 is the sum of the first seven primes.
