= Centered octahedral number =

Centered figurate number representing an octahedron

- Haüy construction of an octahedron by 129 cubes
- Named after: René Just Haüy
- Publication year: 1801
- Total no. of terms: Infinity
- Subsequence of: Polyhedral numbers, Delannoy numbers
- Formula: $\frac{(2n+1)\left(2n^2+2n+3\right)}{3}$
- First terms: 1, 7, 25, 63, 129, 231, 377
- OEIS index: A001845; Centered octahedral

In mathematics, a centered octahedral number or Haüy octahedral number is a figurate number that counts the points of a three-dimensional integer lattice that lie inside an octahedron centered at the origin. The same numbers are special cases of the Delannoy numbers, which count certain two-dimensional lattice paths. The Haüy octahedral numbers are named after René Just Haüy.

== History ==
The name "Haüy octahedral number" comes from the work of René Just Haüy, a French mineralogist active in the late 18th and early 19th centuries. His "Haüy construction" approximates an octahedron as a polycube, formed by accreting concentric layers of cubes onto a central cube. The centered octahedral numbers count the cubes used by this construction. Haüy proposed this construction, and several related constructions of other polyhedra, as a model for the structure of crystalline minerals.

== Formula ==
Number of points on an integer cubic lattice of taxicab distance of up to 0 (black), 1 (red and black) and 2 (red, black and blue) from the origin

The number of three-dimensional lattice points within n steps of the origin is given by the formula

$$\frac{(2n+1)\left(2n^2+2n+3\right)}{3}$$

The first few of these numbers (for n = 0, 1, 2, ...) are

1, 7, 25, 63, 129, 231, 377, 575, 833, 1159, ...

The generating function of the centered octahedral numbers is

$$\frac{(1+x)^3}{(1-x)^4}.$$

The centered octahedral numbers obey the recurrence relation

$$C(n)=C(n-1)+4n^2+2.$$

They may also be computed as the sums of pairs of consecutive octahedral numbers.

== Alternative interpretations ==
63 Delannoy paths through a 3 × 3 grid

The octahedron in the three-dimensional integer lattice, whose number of lattice points is counted by the centered octahedral number, is a metric ball for three-dimensional taxicab geometry, a geometry in which distance is measured by the sum of the coordinatewise distances rather than by Euclidean distance. For this reason, Luther & Mertens (2011) call the centered octahedral numbers "the volume of the crystal ball".

The same numbers can be viewed as figurate numbers in a different way, as the centered figurate numbers generated by a pentagonal pyramid. That is, if one forms a sequence of concentric shells in three dimensions, where the first shell consists of a single point, the second shell consists of the six vertices of a pentagonal pyramid, and each successive shell forms a larger pentagonal pyramid with a triangular number of points on each triangular face and a pentagonal number of points on the pentagonal face, then the total number of points in this configuration is a centered octahedral number.

The centered octahedral numbers are also the Delannoy numbers of the form D(3,n). As for Delannoy numbers more generally, these numbers count the paths from the southwest corner of a 3 × n grid to the northeast corner, using steps that go one unit east, north, or northeast.
