= Anders Björner =

Swedish mathematician (born 1947)

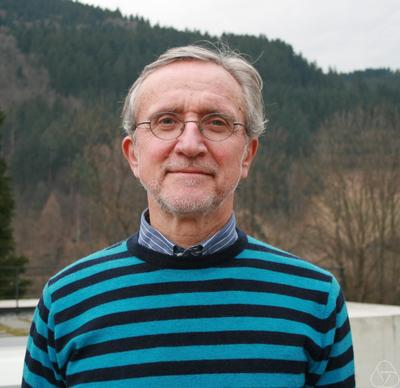
- Anders Björner at Oberwolfach in 2011
- Born: December 17, 1947
- Education: Stockholm University (PhD, 1979)
- Scientific career
- Fields: Mathematics
- Institutions: KTH Royal Institute of Technology
- Thesis: Studies in homological and combinatorical order theory (1979)
- Doctoral advisor: Bernt Lindström
- Doctoral students: Günter M. Ziegler

Anders Björner (born 17 December 1947) is a Swedish professor emeritus in the Department of Mathematics at the Royal Institute of Technology, Stockholm, Sweden. He received his Ph.D. from Stockholm University in 1979, under Bernt Lindström. His research interests are in combinatorics, as well as the related areas of algebra, geometry, topology, and computer science.

His other positions included being director of the Mittag-Leffler Institute and editor-in-chief of Acta Mathematica.

Björner is a recognized expert in algebraic and topological combinatorics. He is a 1983 recipient of the Pólya Prize, and is a member of the Royal Swedish Academy of Sciences since 1999.

In 2025, he received the ‘Mathematics in Sweden Leader Award’.

By mid-2025, he had 120 publications and his D-index was 43.

== Books ==
- Björner, Anders; Las Vergnas, Michael; Sturmfels, Bernd; White, Neil; Ziegler, Günter M. (1999). Oriented Matroids (2nd ed.). Cambridge University Press. ISBN 0-521-77750-X.
- Björner, Anders; Brenti, Francesco (2005). Combinatorics of Coxeter Groups. Graduate Texts in Mathematics. Vol. 231. New York: Springer. ISBN 3-540-44238-3.
- Graham, Ronald L.; Grötschel, Martin; Lovász, László, eds. (1995). "Topological Methods". Handbook of Combinatorics. Amsterdam: North-Holland. pp. 1819–1872.
- Björner, Anders; Ziegler, Günter M. (1992). "8. Introduction to greedoids". In White, Neil (ed.). Matroid Applications. Encyclopedia of Mathematics and its Applications. Vol. 40. Cambridge: Cambridge University Press. pp. 284–357. doi:10.1017/CBO9780511662041.009. ISBN 0-521-38165-7. MR 1165537. Zbl 0772.05026.
