= 52 (number) =

← 51	52	53 →
- ← 50 51 52 53 54 55 56 57 58 59 →: List of numbers; Integers; ← 0 10 20 30 40 50 60 70 80 90 →
- Cardinal: fifty-two
- Ordinal: 52nd (fifty-second)
- Factorization: 2^{2} × 13
- Divisors: 1, 2, 4, 13, 26, 52
- Greek numeral: ΝΒ´
- Roman numeral: LII, lii
- Binary: 110100_{2}
- Ternary: 1221_{3}
- Senary: 124_{6}
- Octal: 64_{8}
- Duodecimal: 44_{12}
- Hexadecimal: 34_{16}

52 (fifty-two) is the natural number following 51 and preceding 53.

== In mathematics ==
52 is the 5th Bell number; there are 52 ways to partition a set of 5 objects.

With an aliquot sum of 46, 52 is within an aliquot sequence of seven composite numbers { 52, 46, 26, 16, 15, 9, 4, 3, 1, 0 } to the prime in the 3-aliquot tree. This sequence does not extend above 52 because 52 is an untouchable number, meaning it is never the sum of proper divisors of any number. It is the first untouchable number larger than 2 and 5.

52 is a noncototient since it is not equal to x − φ(x) for any x .

52 is a decagonal number and a vertically symmetrical number.
