= 51 (number) =

← 50	51	52 →
- ← 50 51 52 53 54 55 56 57 58 59 →: List of numbers; Integers; ← 0 10 20 30 40 50 60 70 80 90 →
- Cardinal: fifty-one
- Ordinal: 51st (fifty-first)
- Factorization: 3 × 17
- Divisors: 1, 3, 17, 51
- Greek numeral: ΝΑ´
- Roman numeral: LI, li
- Binary: 110011_{2}
- Ternary: 1220_{3}
- Senary: 123_{6}
- Octal: 63_{8}
- Duodecimal: 43_{12}
- Hexadecimal: 33_{16}

51 (fifty-one) is the natural number following 50 and preceding 52.

== In mathematics ==
51 as a centered pentagonal number

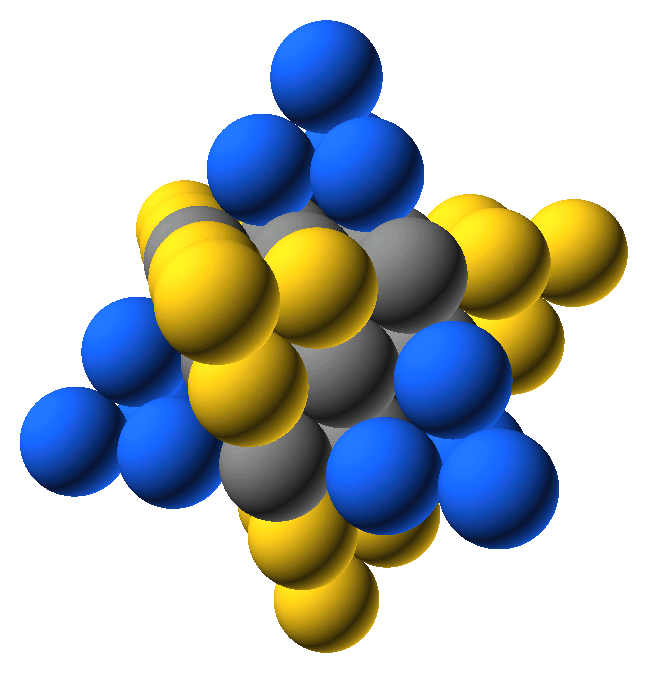
51 as a stella octangula number

Fifty-one is a pentagonal number as well as a centered pentagonal number and an 18-gonal number

It is the 6th Motzkin number, telling the number of ways to draw non-intersecting chords between any six points on a circle's boundary, no matter where the points may be located on the boundary.

It is the 3rd stella octangula number (sequence A007588 in the OEIS).

It forms one side in a primitive Pythagorean triangle (right triangles with integer sides). It is also a number "k" such that 4*k+1 is the hypotenuse of a primitive Pythagorean triple with an odd-length short leg (sequence A375750 in the OEIS) or with an even-length short leg (sequence A376208 in the OEIS).

It is a Perrin number, coming after 22, 29, 39 in the sequence (and the sum of the first two).

It is a Størmer number, since the greatest prime factor of 51^{2} + 1 = 2602 is 1301, which is substantially more than 51 twice.

There are 51 different cyclic Gilbreath permutations on 10 elements, and therefore there are 51 different real periodic points of order 10 on the Mandelbrot set.

Since 51 is the product of the distinct Fermat primes 3 and 17, a regular polygon with 51 sides is constructible with compass and straightedge, the angle π/51 is constructible, and the number cos π/51 is expressible in terms of square roots.
