= 53 (number) =

← 52	53	54 →
- ← 50 51 52 53 54 55 56 57 58 59 →: List of numbers; Integers; ← 0 10 20 30 40 50 60 70 80 90 →
- Cardinal: fifty-three
- Ordinal: 53rd (fifty-third)
- Factorization: prime
- Prime: 16th
- Divisors: 1, 53
- Greek numeral: ΝΓ´
- Roman numeral: LIII, liii
- Binary: 110101_{2}
- Ternary: 1222_{3}
- Senary: 125_{6}
- Octal: 65_{8}
- Duodecimal: 45_{12}
- Hexadecimal: 35_{16}

53 (fifty-three) is the natural number following 52 and preceding 54.

== In mathematics ==
53 is a balanced prime, an isolated prime, the eighth Sophie Germain prime, and the ninth Eisenstein prime. It is a sexy prime with 47 and 59.

53 is the smallest prime number that does not divide the order of any sporadic group, inclusive of the six pariahs; it is also the first prime number that is not a member of Bhargava's prime-universality criterion theorem (followed by the next prime number 59), an integer-matrix quadratic form that represents all prime numbers when it represents the sequence of seventeen integers {2, ..., 47, 67, 73}.

53 is the smallest prime number with primitive roots 2, 3, and 5.
