= Schröder–Hipparchus number =

Number in combinatorics

- Named after: Ernst Schröder, Hipparchus, Eugène Charles Catalan
- Publication year: 1870 (Schröder)
- No. of known terms: infinity
- Formula: $x_n = \frac{1}{n} \sum_{i=0}^{n-1} {n\choose i}{n\choose i+1} 2^i$
- First terms: 1, 1, 3, 11, 45, 197, 903
- OEIS index: A001003; Little Schroeder numbers, Super Catalan

Eleven subdivisions of a pentagon

In combinatorics, the Schröder–Hipparchus numbers form an integer sequence that can be used to count the plane trees with a given set of leaves, the ways of inserting parentheses into a sequence, and the ways of dissecting a convex polygon into smaller polygons by inserting diagonals. These numbers begin

1, 1, 3, 11, 45, 197, 903, 4279, 20793, 103049, ... (sequence A001003 in the OEIS).

They are also called the super-Catalan numbers, the little Schröder numbers, or the Hipparchus numbers, after Eugène Charles Catalan and his Catalan numbers, Ernst Schröder and the closely related Schröder numbers, and the ancient Greek mathematician Hipparchus who appears from evidence in Plutarch to have known of these numbers.

== Combinatorial enumeration applications ==
Combinatorial equivalence between subdivisions of a polygon, plane trees, and parenthesizations

The Schröder–Hipparchus numbers may be used to count several closely related combinatorial objects:

- The nth number in the sequence counts the different ways of subdividing a polygon with n + 1 sides into smaller polygons by adding diagonals of the original polygon.
- The nth number counts the different plane trees with n leaves and with all internal vertices having two or more children.
- The nth number counts the different ways of inserting parentheses into a sequence of n symbols, with each pair of parentheses surrounding two or more symbols or parenthesized groups, without any parentheses surrounding the entire sequence, and where "no parentheses" counts as one way of insertion.
- The nth number counts the faces of all dimensions of an associahedron K_{n + 1} of dimension n − 1, including the associahedron itself as a face, but not including the empty set. For instance, the two-dimensional associahedron K_{4} is a pentagon; it has five vertices, five faces, and one whole associahedron, for a total of 11 faces.

As the figure shows, there is a simple combinatorial equivalence between these objects: a polygon subdivision has a plane tree as a form of its dual graph, the leaves of the tree correspond to the symbols in a parenthesized sequence, and the internal nodes of the tree other than the root correspond to parenthesized groups. The parenthesized sequence itself may be written around the perimeter of the polygon with its symbols on the sides of the polygon and with parentheses at the endpoints of the selected diagonals. This equivalence provides a bijective proof that all of these kinds of objects are counted by a single integer sequence.

The same numbers also count the double permutations (sequences of the numbers from 1 to n, each number appearing twice, with the first occurrences of each number in sorted order) that avoid the permutation patterns 12312 and 121323.

== Related sequences ==
The closely related large Schröder numbers are equal to twice the Schröder–Hipparchus numbers, and may also be used to count several types of combinatorial objects including certain kinds of lattice paths, partitions of a rectangle into smaller rectangles by recursive slicing, and parenthesizations in which a pair of parentheses surrounding the whole sequence of elements is also allowed. The Catalan numbers also count closely related sets of objects including subdivisions of a polygon into triangles, plane trees in which all internal nodes have exactly two children, and parenthesizations in which each pair of parentheses surrounds exactly two symbols or parenthesized groups.

The sequence of Catalan numbers and the sequence of Schröder–Hipparchus numbers, viewed as infinite-dimensional vectors, are the unique eigenvectors for the first two in a sequence of naturally defined linear operators on number sequences. More generally, the kth sequence in this sequence of integer sequences is (x_{1}, x_{2}, x_{3}, ...) where the numbers x_{n} are calculated as the sums of Narayana numbers multiplied by powers of k. This can be expressed as a hypergeometric function:

$$x_n = \sum_{i=1}^n N(n,i)\, k^{i-1} = \sum_{i=1}^n \frac{1}{n}{n\choose i}{n\choose i-1} k^{i-1}={}_2F_1(1-n,-n;2;k).$$

Substituting k = 1 into this formula gives the Catalan numbers and substituting k = 2 into this formula gives the Schröder–Hipparchus numbers.

In connection with the property of Schröder–Hipparchus numbers of counting faces of an associahedron, the number of vertices of the associahedron is given by the Catalan numbers. The corresponding numbers for the permutohedron are respectively the ordered Bell numbers and the factorials.

== Recurrence ==
As well as the summation formula above, the Schröder–Hipparchus numbers may be defined by a recurrence relation:

$$H_n=\frac{1}{n+1}\left((6n-3)H_{n-1}-(n-2)H_{n-2}\right).$$

Stanley proves this fact using generating functions, while Foata and Zeilberger provide a direct combinatorial proof.

== History ==
Plutarch's dialogue Table Talk contains the line:

Chrysippus says that the number of compound propositions that can be made from only ten simple propositions exceeds a million. (Hipparchus, to be sure, refuted this by showing that on the affirmative side there are 103,049 compound statements, and on the negative side 310,952.)

This statement went unexplained until 1994, when David Hough, a graduate student at George Washington University, observed that there are 103049 ways of inserting parentheses into a sequence of ten items. The historian of mathematics Fabio Acerbi (CNRS) has shown that a similar explanation can be provided for the other number: it is very close to the average of the tenth and eleventh Schröder–Hipparchus numbers, 310954, and counts bracketings of ten terms together with a negative particle.

The problem of counting parenthesizations was introduced to modern mathematics by Schröder (1870).

Plutarch's recounting of Hipparchus's two numbers records a disagreement between Hipparchus and the earlier Stoic philosopher Chrysippus, who had claimed that the number of compound propositions that can be made from 10 simple propositions exceeds a million. Contemporary philosopher Susanne Bobzien (2011) has argued that Chrysippus's calculation was the correct one, based on her analysis of Stoic logic. Bobzien reconstructs the calculations of both Chrysippus and Hipparchus, and says that showing how Hipparchus got his mathematics correct but his Stoic logic wrong can cast new light on the Stoic notions of conjunctions and assertibles.
