= Motzkin number =

Number of unique ways to draw non-intersecting chords in a circle

- Named after: Theodore Motzkin
- Publication year: 1948
- Author of publication: Theodore Motzkin
- No. of known terms: infinity
- Formula: see Properties
- First terms: 1, 1, 2, 4, 9, 21, 51
- OEIS index: A001006; Motzkin

In mathematics, the nth Motzkin number is the number of different ways of drawing non-intersecting chords between n points on a circle (not necessarily touching every point by a chord). The Motzkin numbers are named after Theodore Motzkin and have diverse applications in geometry, combinatorics and number theory.

The Motzkin numbers $M_n$ for $n = 0, 1, \dots$ form the sequence:

1, 1, 2, 4, 9, 21, 51, 127, 323, 835, ... (sequence A001006 in the OEIS)

== Examples ==
The following figure shows the 9 ways to draw non-intersecting chords between 4 points on a circle (M_{4} = 9):

The following figure shows the 21 ways to draw non-intersecting chords between 5 points on a circle (M_{5} = 21):

== Properties ==
The Motzkin numbers satisfy the recurrence relations

$$M_{n}=M_{n-1}+\sum_{i=0}^{n-2}M_iM_{n-2-i}=\frac{2n+1}{n+2}M_{n-1}+\frac{3n-3}{n+2}M_{n-2}.$$

The Motzkin numbers can be expressed in terms of binomial coefficients and Catalan numbers:

$$M_n=\sum_{k=0}^{\lfloor n/2\rfloor} \binom{n}{2k} C_k,$$

and inversely,

$$C_{n+1}=\sum_{k=0}^{n} \binom{n}{k} M_k$$

This gives

$$\sum_{k=0}^{n}C_{k} = 1 + \sum_{k=1}^{n} \binom{n}{k} M_{k-1}.$$

The generating function $m(x) = \sum_{n=0}^\infty M_n x^n$ of the Motzkin numbers satisfies

$$x^2 m(x)^2 + (x - 1) m(x) + 1 = 0$$

and is explicitly expressed as

$$m(x) = \frac{1-x-\sqrt{1-2x-3x^2}}{2x^2}.$$

An integral representation of Motzkin numbers is given by

$$M_{n}=\frac{2}{\pi}\int_0^\pi \sin(x)^2(2\cos(x)+1)^n dx$$.

They have the asymptotic behaviour

$$M_{n}\sim \frac{1}{2 \sqrt{\pi}}\left(\frac{3}{n}\right)^{3/2} 3^n,~ n \to \infty$$.

A Motzkin prime is a Motzkin number that is prime. Four such primes are known:

2, 127, 15511, 953467954114363 (sequence A092832 in the OEIS)

== Combinatorial interpretations ==
The Motzkin number for n is also the number of positive integer sequences of length n − 1 in which the opening and ending elements are either 1 or 2, and the difference between any two consecutive elements is −1, 0 or 1. Equivalently, the Motzkin number for n is the number of positive integer sequences of length n + 1 in which the opening and ending elements are 1, and the difference between any two consecutive elements is −1, 0 or 1.

Also, the Motzkin number for n gives the number of routes on the upper right quadrant of a grid from coordinate (0, 0) to coordinate (n, 0) in n steps if one is allowed to move only to the right (up, down or straight) at each step but forbidden from dipping below the y = 0 axis.

For example, the following figure shows the 9 valid Motzkin paths from (0, 0) to (4, 0):

There are at least fourteen different manifestations of Motzkin numbers in different branches of mathematics, as enumerated by Donaghey & Shapiro (1977) in their survey of Motzkin numbers. Guibert, Pergola & Pinzani (2001) showed that vexillary involutions are enumerated by Motzkin numbers.

== See also ==
- Telephone number which represent the number of ways of drawing chords if intersections are allowed
- Delannoy number
- Narayana number
- Schröder number
