= 55 (number) =

← 54	55	56 →
- ← 50 51 52 53 54 55 56 57 58 59 →: List of numbers; Integers; ← 0 10 20 30 40 50 60 70 80 90 →
- Cardinal: fifty-five
- Ordinal: 55th (fifty-fifth)
- Factorization: 5 × 11
- Divisors: 1, 5, 11, 55
- Greek numeral: ΝΕ´
- Roman numeral: LV, lv
- Binary: 110111_{2}
- Ternary: 2001_{3}
- Senary: 131_{6}
- Octal: 67_{8}
- Duodecimal: 47_{12}
- Hexadecimal: 37_{16}

55 (fifty-five) is the natural number following 54 and preceding 56.

== Mathematics ==
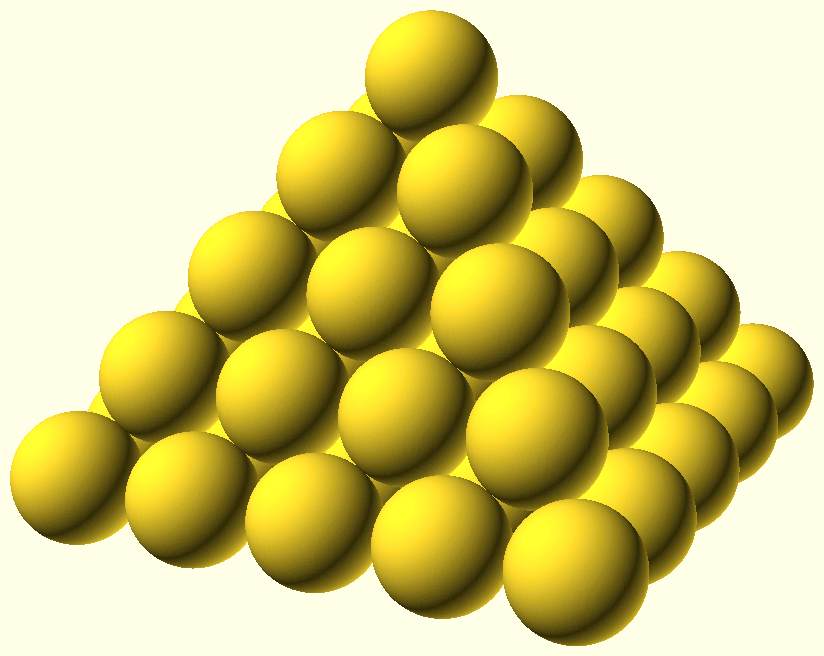
55 is a square pyramidal number.

55 is composite number, a Fibonacci number and a Triangular number.

== Transportation ==
In the United States, the National Maximum Speed Law prohibited speed limits higher than 55 miles per hour (90 km/h) from 1974 to 1987. The number 55 became a popular shorthand for the 55 mph speed limit. For example, a hand with a pair of fives in Texas hold'em poker is referred to as a "speed limit".
