= 59 (number) =

← 58	59	60 →
- ← 50 51 52 53 54 55 56 57 58 59 →: List of numbers; Integers; ← 0 10 20 30 40 50 60 70 80 90 →
- Cardinal: fifty-nine
- Ordinal: 59th (fifty-ninth)
- Factorization: prime
- Prime: 17th
- Divisors: 1, 59
- Greek numeral: ΝΘ´
- Roman numeral: LIX, lix
- Binary: 111011_{2}
- Ternary: 2012_{3}
- Senary: 135_{6}
- Octal: 73_{8}
- Duodecimal: 4B_{12}
- Hexadecimal: 3B_{16}

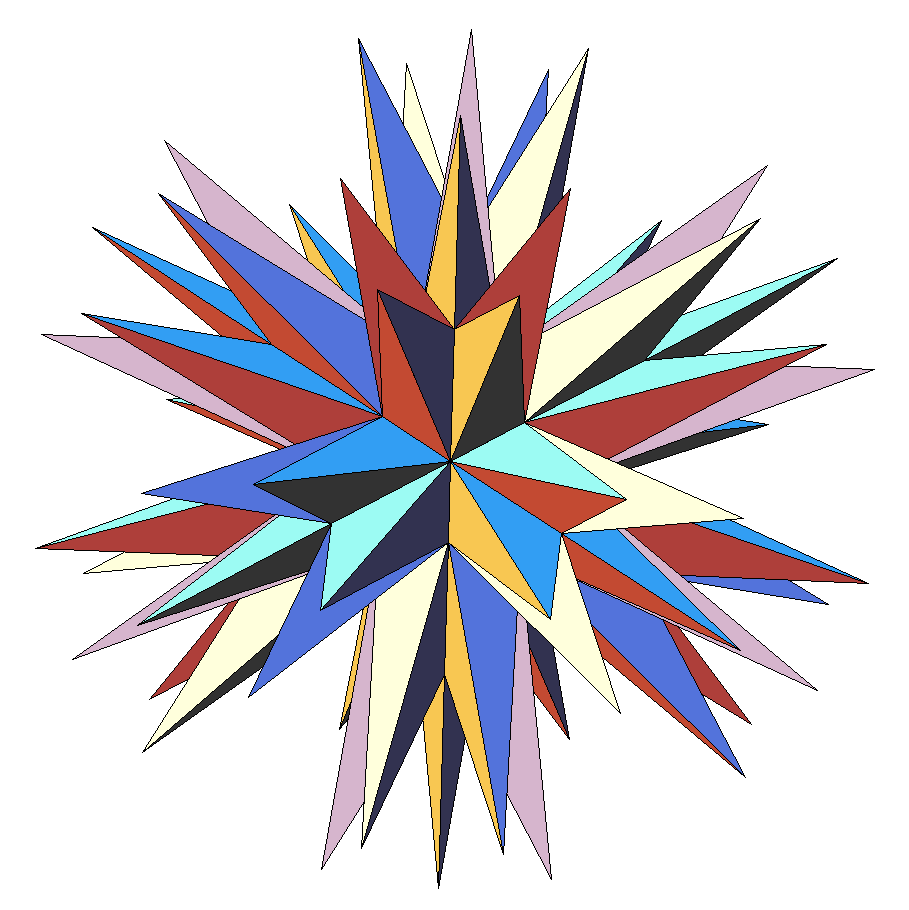
A regular icosahedron has 59 stellations.

59 (fifty-nine) is the natural number following 58 and preceding 60.

== In mathematics ==
59 is the 17th prime number, and 7th super-prime. It is also a good prime, a Higgs prime, an irregular prime, a Pillai prime, a Ramanujan prime, a safe prime, a sexy prime, and a supersingular prime. The next prime number is sixty-one, with which it comprises a twin prime.

There are 59 stellations of the regular icosahedron.

== In other fields ==
The "59-minute rule" is an informal rule in business, whereby (usually near a holiday) employees may be allowed to leave work early, often to beat heavy holiday traffic (the 59 minutes coming from the rule that leaving one full hour early requires the use of leave, whereas leaving 59 minutes early would not).

The number 59 was on a button commonly worn by feminist activists in the 1970s; this was based on the claim that a woman earned 59 cents to an equally qualified man's dollar.
