= 57 (number) =

← 56	57	58 →
- ← 50 51 52 53 54 55 56 57 58 59 →: List of numbers; Integers; ← 0 10 20 30 40 50 60 70 80 90 →
- Cardinal: fifty-seven
- Ordinal: 57th (fifty-seventh)
- Factorization: 3 × 19
- Divisors: 1, 3, 19, 57
- Greek numeral: ΝΖ´
- Roman numeral: LVII, lvii
- Binary: 111001_{2}
- Ternary: 2010_{3}
- Senary: 133_{6}
- Octal: 71_{8}
- Duodecimal: 49_{12}
- Hexadecimal: 39_{16}

57 (fifty-seven) is the natural number following 56 and preceding 58.

== In mathematics ==
57 has prime factorization $3\cdot19$, and is therefore a semiprime. Its proper divisors are 1, 3, and 19, whose sum is 23, so 57 is a deficient number. Since both prime factors are congruent to 3 modulo 4, $57=3\cdot19$ is a Blum integer. It is a Leyland number, because $57 = 2^5 + 5^2$.

The split Lie algebra E_{7 1/2} has a 57-dimensional Heisenberg algebra as its nilradical, and the smallest possible homogeneous space for E_{8} is also 57-dimensional.

Although fifty-seven is not prime, it is jokingly known as the Grothendieck prime after a legend in which the mathematician Alexander Grothendieck gave it as an example of a prime number, not realizing it was divisible by three and nineteen. The same error was made by another famous mathematician, Hermann Weyl, in a published article.
