= 56 (number) =

← 55	56	57 →
- ← 50 51 52 53 54 55 56 57 58 59 →: List of numbers; Integers; ← 0 10 20 30 40 50 60 70 80 90 →
- Cardinal: fifty-six
- Ordinal: 56th (fifty-sixth)
- Factorization: 2^{3} × 7
- Divisors: 1, 2, 4, 7, 8, 14, 28, 56
- Greek numeral: ΝϚ´
- Roman numeral: LVI, lvi
- Binary: 111000_{2}
- Ternary: 2002_{3}
- Senary: 132_{6}
- Octal: 70_{8}
- Duodecimal: 48_{12}
- Hexadecimal: 38_{16}

56 (fifty-six) is the natural number following 55 and preceding 57.

== Mathematics ==
Regular 56-gon, associated by the Pythagoreans with Typhon

56 is a composite number with prime factorization $2^3\cdot7$. Its proper divisors are 1, 2, 4, 7, 8, 14, and 28, whose sum is 64, so 56 is an abundant number. It is also a semiperfect number, since $56=28+14+8+4+2$.

56 is a tetrahedral number, since $56=\binom{8}{3}$. It is also a pronic number, since $56=7\cdot8$, and a tetranacci number.

56 is an Erdős–Woods number, meaning that there is an interval of 57 consecutive integers in which every element has a nontrivial common factor with one of the two endpoints.

In Lie theory, the exceptional Lie algebra $E_7$ has a fundamental representation of dimension 56.

== Mythology ==
Plutarch states that the Pythagoreans associated a polygon of 56 sides with Typhon and that they associated certain polygons of smaller numbers of sides with other figures in Greek mythology.

== Organizations ==
- The symbol of the Hungarian Revolution of 1956.
- Brazilian politician Enéas Carneiro had an odd way of repeating the number of his party, "Fifty-Six" (cinquenta e seis, in Portuguese), making it a widely repeated jargon in Brazil.
