= Henri Delannoy =

French mathematician

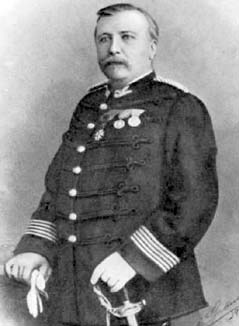
Henri–Auguste Delannoy

Henri–Auguste Delannoy (French pronunciation: [ɑ̃ʁi oɡyst dəlanwa]; 28 September 1833 – 5 February 1915) was a French army officer and amateur mathematician, after whom the Delannoy numbers are named.

Delannoy grew up in Guéret, France, the son of a military accountant. After taking the baccalaureate in 1849, he studied mathematics in Bourges, near where his family lived, and after continuing his studies in Paris entered the École Polytechnique in 1853. He served as a lieutenant in the French artillery in the Second Italian War of Independence, in 1859, and became a captain in 1863. He continued to serve in the military, but shifted from the artillery to the supply corps; he served in Africa, became governor of a military hospital in Algeria, participated in the Franco-Prussian War in 1870, and eventually became an intendant in Orléans before retiring in 1889. His military decorations include the cross and officer's rosette of the Legion of Honour, awarded in 1868 and 1886 respectively.

Beginning in 1879, Delannoy began a correspondence with Édouard Lucas on the subject of recreational mathematics and probability theory; he eventually published eleven mathematics articles. Along with his mathematical interests, Delannoy wrote about local history, painted, and from 1896 to 1915 served as the president of the Société des Sciences Naturelles et archéologiques de la Creuse.
