= Proof of Bertrand's postulate =

Solved prime-number problem

In mathematics, Bertrand's postulate (now a theorem) states that, for each $n \ge 2$, there is a prime $p$ such that $n<p<2n$. First conjectured in 1845 by Joseph Bertrand, it was first proven by Chebyshev, and a shorter but also advanced proof was given by Ramanujan.

An elementary proof was published by Paul Erdős in 1932, as one of his earliest mathematical publications. The basic idea is to show that the central binomial coefficients must have a prime factor within the interval $(n, 2n)$ in order to be large enough. This is achieved through analysis of their factorizations.

The main steps of the proof are as follows. First, one shows that the contribution of every prime power factor $p^r$ in the prime decomposition of the central binomial coefficient $\textstyle\binom{2n}{n}=(2n)!/(n!)^2$ is at most $2n$; then, one shows that every prime larger than $\sqrt{2n}$ appears at most once.

The next step is to prove that $\tbinom{2n}{n}$ has no prime factors in the interval $(\tfrac{2n}{3}, n)$. As a consequence of these bounds, the contribution to the size of $\tbinom{2n}{n}$ coming from the prime factors that are at most $n$ grows asymptotically as $\theta^{\!\;n}$ for some $\theta<4$. Since the asymptotic growth of the central binomial coefficient is at least $4^n\!/2n$, the conclusion is that, by contradiction and for large enough $n$, the binomial coefficient must have another prime factor, which can only lie between $n$ and $2n$.

The argument below is essentially that given by Erdős and is valid for all $n\ge128$. The remaining values of $n$ are verified by direct inspection, which completes the proof.

== Lemmas in the proof ==
The proof uses the following four lemmas to establish facts about the primes present in the central binomial coefficients.

=== Lemma 1 ===
For any integer $n>0$, we have

$$\frac{4^n}{2n} \le \binom{2n}{n}.$$

Proof: Applying the binomial theorem,

$$4^n = (1 + 1)^{2n} = \sum_{k = 0}^{2n} \binom{2n}{k}=2+\sum_{k = 1}^{2n-1} \binom{2n}{k} \le 2n\binom{2n}{n},$$

since $\tbinom{2n}{n}$ is the largest term in the sum in the left-hand side, and the sum has $2n$ terms (including the initial $2$ outside the summation).

=== Lemma 2 ===
For a fixed prime $p$, define $R(n,p)=\nu_p( \tbinom{2n}{n} )$ to be the p-adic valuation of the central binomial coefficient $\tbinom{2n}{n}$, that is, the largest natural number $r$ such that $p^r$ divides $\tbinom{2n}{n}$, or equivalently, the exponent to which $p$ appears in the prime factorization of $\tbinom{2n}{n}$.

For any prime $p$, $p^{R(n,p)}\le 2n$.

Proof: The exponent of $p$ in $n!$ is given by Legendre's formula

$$\sum_{j = 1}^\infty \left\lfloor \frac{n}{p^j} \right\rfloor\!,$$

so

$$R(n,p)=\sum_{j = 1}^\infty \left\lfloor \frac{2n}{p^j} \right\rfloor - 2\sum_{j = 1}^\infty \left\lfloor \frac{n}{p^j} \right\rfloor=\sum_{j = 1}^\infty \left(\left\lfloor \frac{2n}{p^j} \right\rfloor - 2\!\left\lfloor \frac{n}{p^j} \right\rfloor\right)$$

But each term of the last summation must be either zero (if $n/p^j \bmod 1<1/2$) or one (if $n/p^j\bmod 1\ge1/2$), and all terms with $j>\log_p(2n)$ are zero. Therefore,

$$R(n,p) \le \log_p(2n),$$

and

$$p^{R(n,p)} \le p^{\log_p(2n)} = 2n.$$

=== Lemma 3 ===
If $p$ is an odd prime and $\frac{2n}{3} < p \leq n$, then $R(n,p) = 0.$

Proof: There are exactly two factors of $p$ in the numerator of the expression $\tbinom{2n}{n}=(2n)!/(n!)^2$, coming from the two terms $p$ and $2p$ in $(2n)!$, and also two factors of $p$ in the denominator from one copy of the term $p$ in each of the two factors of $n!$. These factors all cancel, leaving no factors of $p$ in $\tbinom{2n}{n}$. (The bound on $p$ in the preconditions of the lemma ensures that $3p$ is too large to be a term of the numerator, and the assumption that $p$ is odd is needed to ensure that $2p$ contributes only one factor of $p$ to the numerator.)

=== Lemma 4 ===
An upper bound is supplied for the primorial function,

$$n\#=\prod_{p\,\le\,n}p,$$

where the product is taken over all prime numbers $p$ less than or equal to $n$.

For all $n\ge1$, $n\#<4^n$.

Proof: We use complete induction.

For $n=1,2$ we have $1\#=1<4$ and $2\#=2<4^2=16$.

Let us assume that the inequality holds for all $1\le n\le2k-1$. Since $n=2k>2$ is composite, we have

$$(2k)\#=(2k-1)\#<4^{2k-1}<4^{2k}.$$

Now let us assume that the inequality holds for all $1\le n\le2k$. Since $\binom{2k+1}{k}=\frac{(2k+1)!}{k!(k+1)!}$ is an integer and all the primes $k+2\le p\le2k+1$ appear only in the numerator, we have

$$\frac{(2k+1)\#}{(k+1)\#}\le\binom{2k+1}{k}=\frac12\!\left[\binom{2k+1}{k}+\binom{2k+1}{k+1}\right]<\frac12(1+1)^{2k+1}=4^k .$$

Therefore,

$$(2k+1)\#=(k+1)\#\cdot\frac{(2k+1)\#}{(k+1)\#}\le4^{k+1}\binom{2k+1}{k}<4^{k+1}\cdot4^k=4^{2k+1}.$$

== Proof from the lemmas ==
Consider the factorization of $\binom{2n}{n}$ into primes

$$\binom{2n}{n}=\left(\,\prod_{p\,\le\,\sqrt{2n}}p^{R(p,n)}\right)\!\!\left(\prod_{\sqrt{2n}\,<\,p\,\le\,2n/3}\!\!\!\!\!\!\!p^{R(p,n)}\right)\!\!\left(\,\prod_{n\,<\,p\,\leq\,2n}p\right)$$

Here we have used Lemma 3, which says that no prime $\frac{2n}{3} < p \leq n$ occurs.

Now Lemma 1 gives a lower bound $\binom{2n}{n}\geq\frac{4^n}{2n}$, whereas Lemma 2 gives the upper bound
$$\left(\,\prod_{p\,\le\,\sqrt{2n}}p^{R(p,n)}\right)\leq(2n)^{\pi(\sqrt{2n})}$$
in terms of the prime-counting function $\pi(x)$. For the middle factor we have $p^2>2n$, so $R(p,n)\leq1$ by Lemma 2. Thus Lemma 4 gives the upper bound

$$\prod_{\sqrt{2n}\,<\,p\,\le\,2n/3}\!\!\!\!\!\!\!p^{R(p,n)}\leq\prod_{p\,\leq\,2n/3}p<4^{2n/3}$$

We see that if $(2n)^{\pi(\sqrt{2n})}\cdot4^{2n/3}\leq\frac{4^n}{2n}$, then the third factor $\prod_{n\,<\,p\,\leq 2n}p$ must be greater than one, and so there must be a prime $n<p\leq2n$; that is, $\pi(2n)>\pi(n)$.

Next, for all $m\geq9$ we have $\pi(m)\leq\frac{2m}{3}-1$. This follows by disregarding the numbers 1, 9 and all even numbers bigger than 2, the number of which is at least $1+\frac{m-1}{2}>1+\frac{m}{3}$. Substituting in to the inequality above and rearranging we see that $\pi(2n)>\pi(n)$ whenever $(2n)^{(2/3)\sqrt{2n}}\leq 4^{n/3}$.

Taking the base-2 logarithm this becomes $(1+\log_2(n))\sqrt{2n}\leq n$. Squaring both sides we obtain $2(1+\log_2(n))^2\leq n$. The two sides are equal when $n=128$, so the concavity of the left-hand side tells us that the inequality holds for all $n\geq 128$. (The requirement that $\sqrt{2n}\geq 9$ clearly holds on this range.)

In summary we have shown that $\pi(2n)>\pi(n)$ for all $n\geq128$. For $n<128$ the result also holds, as can be seen from the list of prime numbers 2,3,5,7,13,23,43,83,163, where each is less than twice its predecessor. Thus the result holds for all integers$n\geq1$.
