= Mark Ellingham =

The smaller of the two Ellingham–Horton graphs

Mark Norman Ellingham is a professor of mathematics at Vanderbilt University whose research concerns graph theory. With Joseph D. Horton, he is the discoverer and namesake of the Ellingham–Horton graphs, two cubic 3-vertex-connected bipartite graphs that have no Hamiltonian cycle.

Ellingham earned his Ph.D. in 1986 from the University of Waterloo under the supervision of Lawrence Bruce Richmond. In 2012, he became one of the inaugural fellows of the American Mathematical Society.
