= Günter M. Ziegler =

German mathematician (born 1963)

Günter Matthias Ziegler
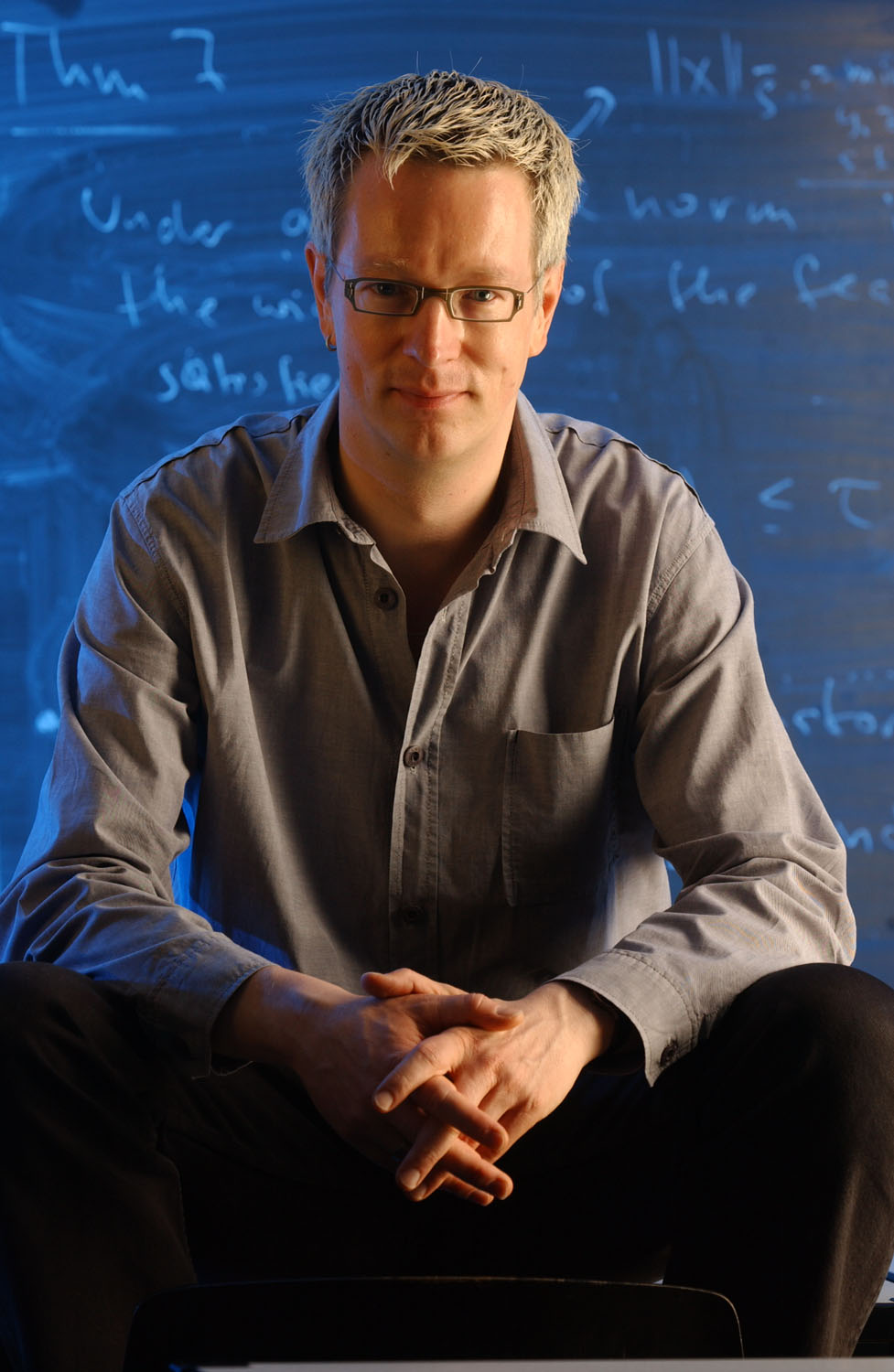
- Ziegler in 2006
- Born: 19 May 1963 (age 63); Munich, Bavaria, West Germany
- Education: LMU Munich; Massachusetts Institute of Technology
- Known for: work on polytopes, topological combinatorics
- Awards: Gottfried Wilhelm Leibniz Prize (2001); Chauvenet Prize (2006); Leroy P. Steele Prize (2018)
- Scientific career
- Fields: Mathematics
- Workplaces: Free University of Berlin
- Doctoral advisor: Anders Björner
- Doctoral students: Karim Adiprasito

Günter Matthias Ziegler (born 19 May 1963) is a German mathematician who has been working as president of the Free University of Berlin since 2018. Ziegler is known for his research in discrete mathematics and geometry, and particularly on the combinatorics of polytopes.

== Biography ==
Ziegler studied at LMU Munich from 1981 to 1984, and went on to receive his Ph.D. from the Massachusetts Institute of Technology in Cambridge, Massachusetts, in 1987, under the supervision of Anders Björner. After postdoctoral positions at the University of Augsburg and the Mittag-Leffler Institute, he received his habilitation in 1992 from Technische Universität Berlin, which he joined as a professor in 1995. Ziegler has since joined the faculty of the Free University of Berlin.

== Awards and honors ==
Ziegler was awarded the one million Deutschmark Gerhard Hess Prize by the Deutsche Forschungsgemeinschaft (DFG) in 1994 and the 1.5 million Deutschmark Gottfried Wilhelm Leibniz Prize, Germany's highest research honor, by the DFG in 2001. He was awarded the 2005 Gauss Lectureship by the German Mathematical Society. In 2006, the Mathematical Association of America awarded Ziegler and Florian Pfender its highest honor for mathematical exposition, the Chauvenet Prize, for their paper on kissing numbers.

In 2006 Ziegler became president of the German Mathematical Society for a two-year term. In 2009, the European Research Council (ERC) awarded Ziegler one of the ERC Advanced Grants in the amount of 1.85 million Euros. In 2012 he became a fellow of the American Mathematical Society. In 2013, Ziegler was granted the Hector Science Award and became a member of the Hector Fellow Academy. Since 2016, Ziegler has been chair of the Berlin Mathematical School. In 2018, he received the Leroy P. Steele Prize for Mathematical Exposition (jointly with Martin Aigner) for Proofs from THE BOOK.

== Other activities ==
- Berlin Institute of Health (BIH), Member of the Supervisory Board (since 2020)
- German Institute for Economic Research (DIW), member of the board of trustees (since 2018)
- Genshagener Kreis, member of the board of trustees (since 2018)
- Einstein Foundation Berlin, Member of the Council
- Max Delbrück Center for Molecular Medicine in the Helmholtz Association (MDC), member of the supervisory board
- Berlin Social Science Center (WZB), member of the board of trustees (since 2018)
- Klaus Tschira Foundation, member of the board of trustees (since 2017)
- Urania, Member of the Board

== Selected publications ==
- Aigner, Martin; Ziegler, Günter M. (1998), Proofs from THE BOOK, Berlin: Springer, ISBN 3-540-63698-6; 6th ed, 2018.
- Ziegler, Günter M. (1995), Lectures on Polytopes, Graduate Texts in Mathematics, vol. 152, Berlin, New York: Springer-Verlag.
- Björner, Anders; Ziegler, Günter M. (1992), "Introduction to greedoids", in White, Neil (ed.), Matroid Applications, Encyclopedia of Mathematics and its Applications, vol. 40, Cambridge: Cambridge University Press, pp. 284–357, doi:10.1017/CBO9780511662041.009, ISBN 0-521-38165-7, MR 1165537
