= Igor Kluvánek =

Slovak-Australian mathematician

- Born: 27 January 1931; Košice, Slovakia
- Died: 24 July 1993 (aged 62); Bratislava, Slovakia
- Education: Slovak Polytechnic University
- Scientific career
- Fields: Mathematician
- Workplaces: The Flinders University of South Australia; University of Pavol Jozef Šafárik

Igor Kluvánek (27 January 1931 – 24 July 1993) was a Slovak-Australian mathematician.

== Academic career ==
Igor Kluvánek obtained his first degree in electrical engineering from the Slovak Polytechnic University, Bratislava, in 1953. His first appointment was in the Department of Mathematics of the same institution. At the same time he worked for his C.Sc. degree obtained from the Slovak Academy of Sciences. In the early 60's he joined the Department of Mathematical Analysis of the University of Pavol Jozef Šafárik in Košice. During 1967–68 he held a visiting position at The Flinders University of South Australia. The events of 1968 in Czechoslovakia made it impossible for him and his family to return to their homeland. The Flinders University of South Australia was able to create a chair in applied mathematics to which he was appointed in January 1969 and occupied until his resignation in 1986.

== Early years ==
Kluvánek graduated in 1953 from the Slovak Polytechnic University with a degree in electrical engineering specialising in vacuum technology. That year, he married a former classmate from the gymnasium at Rimavská Sobota. To support himself, he became a part-time tutor/lecturer in the Department of Mathematics at the Faculty of Electrical Engineering, where he remained after completing his studies. At the same time, he worked for his C.Sc. degree obtained from the Slovak Academy of Sciences.

In 1961, it became known at the polytechnic that he was a practising Catholic, which was deemed to be incompatible with the position of a socialist teacher. At that time, an attempt was made to minimise ideological confrontations in the interests of economic development. The affair blew over when he joined the Department of Mathematical Analysis of ŠafárikUniversity in his birthplace, Košice.

== To Australia ==
With the approval of the Czechoslovak authorities, he arrived with his wife and five children in Adelaide in March 1967 to take up a two-year visiting position at the newly established Flinders University of South Australia. His wife and children departed Australia on 20 August 1968, in time for the children to start the new School year in September. While they were on their way, the 1968 Warsaw Pact invasion of Czechoslovakia took place. They landed in Zürich, but all communications with Czechoslovakia were severed. They had no entry visa to any country, so the Swiss authorities put them on a plane back to Australia that day. Thus started his twenty-year sojourn in Australia.

It seems that he would have returned with his family if he had not been sentenced in Czechoslovakia, in absentia, to a two-year prison sentence after his unexpected stay in Australia was deemed illegal by the Czechoslovak authorities. The enquiries conducted by his family in Czechoslovakia on his behalf, suggest that this penalty was only quashed in the late 1980s.

Besides his prison sentence, his wife had one year imprisonment imposed and all his property at home was forfeited, so they were effectively destitute and stateless. Fortunately, after his contract expired, Flinders created a chair in applied mathematics, which they offered to him. His wife died in 1981.

== Back To Slovakia ==
He resigned his chair at Flinders in 1986 and after some unsuccessful attempts to study at seminaries in Sydney (1982) and Melbourne (1987–88) followed by temporary positions at the Centre for Mathematical Analysis in Canberra, he eventually left Australia in 1989 to settle in Bratislava. His children have remained in Australia. The gradual process of liberalisation in Czechoslovakia had facilitated his departure. The velvet revolution heralded his return home, and so his third life began. He became a member of the Slovak Academy of Sciences and remarried. His persecution by the old régime had conferred upon him the status of something of a celebrity. He declined an invitation to become minister of education. There was some disillusionment with the nature and pace of the institutional reform in Slovakia and he held several positions in quick succession. It was as he was about to leave his last position at the Slovak Technical University that he died.

His five children stayed in Australia after his death, initially living in Adelaide and Melbourne.

== Research ==
Igor Kluvánek made significant contributions to applied mathematics, functional analysis, operator theory and vector-valued integration. One needs only to consult his book Vector Measures and Control Systems written with Greg Knowles or examine the contents and historical notes of the monograph Vector Measures by J. Diestel and J.J. Uhl, Jr., to see that his penetrating studies into this area, of which he is one of the pioneers, pervade the subject. He has also made important contributions to various topics in harmonic analysis. For a sample of his influence in this area, see the excellent survey article "Five short stories about the cardinal series", Bull. Amer. Math. Soc., 12 (1985), 45–89, by J.R. Higgins which highlights the essential role played by just one of Kluvánek's paper in the "story" of the sampling theorem. Kluvánek introduced the concept of a closed vector measure. This notion was crucial for his investigations of the range of a vector measure and led to the extension to infinite dimensional spaces of the classical Liapunov convexity theorem, together with many consequences and applications. This work was in collaboration with G. Knowles and settled many of the major problems in this area. The notion of a closed vector measure stimulated much research, especially by W. Graves and his students at Chapel Hill, North Carolina. In intervening years it turned out that this notion is not only a basic tool in the study of algebras of operators generated by Boolean algebras of projections but lies at the very core of the major theorems in this area, even throwing a new perspective on the classical results in this field.

As successful as the theory of integration with respect to countably additive vector measures has been in various branches of mathematics, such as mathematical physics, functional analysis and operator theory, for example, it is also known that there are fundamental problems which cannot be treated in this way. Nevertheless, these problems still seem to require for their solution "some sort of integration process" that Kluvánek pursued to the end of his career. Some of his galaxy of ideas about integration appeared in his book Integration Structures.

As well as his research publications, it should be mentioned that Igor Kluvánek co-authored, with L. Mišík and M. Švec, a two volume text book (in Slovak) on Differential and Integral calculus, Analytic geometry, Differential equations and Complex variables which has seen two editions and been widely used in Czechoslovakia. He also wrote lecture notes (in Slovak) with M. Kováříková and Z. Kovářík on first year university analysis and a popular book (also in Slovak) with L. Bukovský on the pigeonhole principle. He spent a great deal of time during his appointment at Flinders developing course material for a basic foundation in mathematics. His presentation of the material changed over time as he developed new research ideas. He could not get it published in English but two volumes have been translated and published in Slovak with the third volume to appear in 2008. In addition, he wrote various articles of a pedagogic nature.
