= Tadepalli Venkata Narayana =

Mathematician

T. V. Narayana (Tadepalli Venkata Narayana) (23 April 1930 – 6 February 1987) was an Indo-Canadian mathematical statistician and mathematician known for his contributions to combinatorics, lattice theory and mathematical statistics. A certain sequence of numbers called the Narayana numbers and a certain class of polynomials called Narayana polynomials, which were both named after him for his work in bringing out their importance in lattice path theory, have found extensive and varied applications in combinatorics and lattice theory.

Narayana was born in Madras (now Chennai), India on 23 April 1930. He studied at the Madras and Bombay universities in India before joining the North Carolina University for pursuing PhD studies under the supervision of Raj Chandra Bose. He was awarded the PhD degree in mathematical statistics in the year 1954 for a dissertation titled Sequential Procedures in Probit Analysis. After securing PhD, Narayana did Post-Doctoral work at Indian Council of Agricultural Research, New Delhi and at the Henri Poincare Institute in Paris. He was appointed Assistant Professor at McGill University, Canada in 1955. In 1958, he joined The University of Alberta, Canada as an Associate Professor and was promoted to Professor in 1966. While at The University of Alberta, Narayana supervised the research work of several graduate students. He made seminal contributions to the theory of tournaments, compositions, sampling plans and lattice path combinatorics. Much of his work was collected together in a monograph titled "Lattice Path Combinatorics with Statistical Applications", published by the University of Toronto Press in 1979.
