= Lattice path =

Sequence of end-to-end vectors across points of a lattice

Lattice path of length 5 in ℤ^{2} with S = { (2,0), (1,1), (0,-1) }.

In combinatorics, a lattice path L in the d-dimensional integer lattice $\mathbb{Z}^d$ of length k with steps in the set S, is a sequence of vectors $v_0, v_1, \ldots, v_k \in \mathbb{Z}^d$ such that each consecutive difference $v_i - v_{i-1}$ lies in S. A lattice path may lie in any lattice in $\mathbb{R}^d$, but the integer lattice $\mathbb{Z}^d$ is most commonly used.

An example of a lattice path in $\mathbb{Z}^2$ of length 5 with steps in $S = \lbrace (2,0), (1,1), (0,-1) \rbrace$ is $L = \lbrace (-1,-2), (0,-1), (2,-1), (2,-2), (2,-3), (4,-3) \rbrace$.

== North-East lattice paths ==
A North-East (NE) lattice path is a lattice path in $\mathbb{Z}^2$ with steps in $S = \lbrace (0,1), (1,0) \rbrace$. The $(0,1)$ steps are called North steps and denoted by $N$s; the $(1,0)$ steps are called East steps and denoted by $E$s.

NE lattice paths most commonly begin at the origin. This convention allows encoding all the information about a NE lattice path $L$ in a single permutation word. The length of the word gives the number of steps of the lattice path, $k$. The order of the $N$s and $E$s communicates the sequence of $L$. Furthermore, the number of $N$s and the number of $E$s in the word determines the end point of $L$.

If the permutation word for a NE lattice path contains $n$ $N$-steps and $e$ $E$-steps, and if the path begins at the origin, then the path necessarily ends at $(e,n)$. This follows because the path "walks" exactly $n$ steps North and $e$ steps East from $(0,0)$.

The four NE lattice paths starting from $(0,0)$ with exactly one $N$ and three $E$s. The endpoint is necessarily at $(3,1)$.

== Counting lattice paths ==
Lattice paths are often used to count other combinatorial objects. Similarly, there are many combinatorial objects that count the number of lattice paths of a certain kind. This occurs when the lattice paths are in bijection with the object in question. For example,

- Dyck paths are counted by the $n^{\text{th}}$ Catalan number $C_n$. A Dyck path is a lattice path in $\mathbb{Z}^2$ from $(0,0)$ to $(2n,0)$ with steps in $S = \lbrace (1,1), (1,-1) \rbrace$ that never passes below the $x$-axis. Equivalently, a Dyck path is a NE lattice path from $(0,0)$ to $(n,n)$ that lies strictly below (but may touch) the diagonal $y=x$.
- The Schröder numbers count the number of lattice paths from $(0,0)$ to $(n,n)$ with steps in $(1,0), (0,1)$ and $(1,1)$ that never rise above the diagonal $y=x$.
- The number of NE lattice paths from $(0,0)$ to $(a,b)$ counts the number of combinations of $a$ objects out of a set of $a + b$ objects.

== Combinations and NE lattice paths ==
NE lattice paths have close connections to the number of combinations, which are counted by the binomial coefficient, and arranged in Pascal's triangle. The diagram below demonstrates some of these connections.

The number of lattice paths from $(0,0)$ to $(2,3)$ is equal to $\binom{2+3}{2} =\binom{5}{2} = 10$.

The number of lattice paths from $(0,0)$ to $(n,k)$ is equal to the binomial coefficient $\binom{n+k}{n}$. The diagram shows this for $0 \leq k \leq n =4$. If one rotates the diagram 135° clockwise about the origin and extends it to include all $n,k \in \mathbb{N} \cup \lbrace 0 \rbrace$, then one obtains Pascal's triangle. This result is because the $k^{\text{th}}$ entry of the $n^{\text{th}}$ row of Pascal's Triangle is the binomial coefficient $\binom{n}{k}$.

=== Problems and proofs ===
The graphical representation of NE lattice paths lends itself to many bijective proofs involving combinations. Here are a few examples.

- $\sum_{k=0}^n \binom{n}{k} ^2 = \binom{2n}{n}.$

Proof: The right-hand side is equal to the number of NE lattice paths from $(0,0)$ to $(n,n)$. Each of these NE lattice paths intersects exactly one of the lattice points in the rectangular array with coordinates $(x, n-x)$ for $x \in \lbrace 0, 1, \ldots, n \rbrace$. This is shown in the figure below for $n=4$: Every NE lattice path from $(0,0)$ to $(4,4)$ intersects exactly one of the colored nodes.

Each NE lattice path passes through exactly one colored node.

On the left-hand side, the binomial coefficient squared, $\binom{n}{k}^2$, represents two copies of the set of NE lattice paths from $(0,0)$ to $(k,n-k)$ attached endpoint-to-startpoint. Rotating the second copy 90° clockwise does not change the combinatorics of the object: $\binom{n}{k} = \binom{n}{n-k}$. So the total number of lattice paths remains the same.

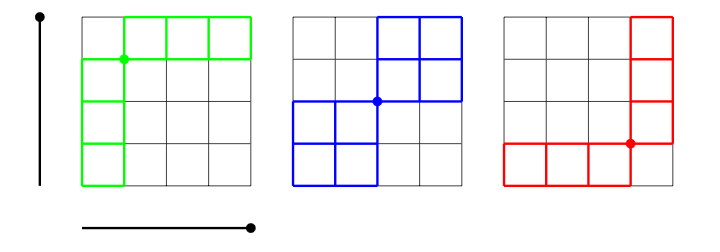
Sets of NE lattice paths squared, with the second copy rotated 90° clockwise.

Superimpose the NE lattice paths squared onto the same rectangular array, as seen in the figure below. We see that all NE lattice paths from $(0,0)$ to $(n,n)$ are accounted for. In particular, any lattice path passing through the red lattice point (for example) is counted by the squared set of lattice paths (also shown in red). $\Box$

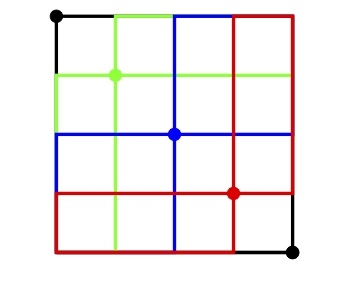
Superimposed sets of NE lattice paths squared. All NE lattice paths are accounted for.

== See also ==
- Tadepalli Venkata Narayana

== General references ==
- Narayana, Tadepalli Venkata (15 December 1979). Lattice Path Combinatorics with Statistical Applications (1 ed.). Toronto: University of Toronto Press. ISBN 978-1487587284.
- Song, Chunwei (2024). Lattice Path Combinatorics and Special Counting Sequences: From an Enumerative Perspective (1 ed.). Boca Raton: CRC Press. doi:10.1201/9781003509912. ISBN 978-1032671758.
