= List of examples of Stigler's law =

Stigler's law concerns the supposed tendency of eponymous expressions for scientific discoveries to honor people other than their respective originators.

Examples include:

== A ==
- Aharonov–Bohm effect. Werner Ehrenberg and Raymond E. Siday first predicted the effect in 1949, and similar effects were later rediscovered by Yakir Aharonov and David Bohm in 1959.
- Ampère's circuital law was inspired by the experimental results of André-Marie Ampère, and named in his honor. However, it was James Clerk Maxwell who combined those results into a single mathematical law.
- Arabic numerals, first developed in India around 7th century.
- Archimedes' screw is known to predate Archimedes by at least three centuries in ancient Babylon.
- Argand diagram by Caspar Wessel in 1797, predating Jean-Robert Argand by nine years.
- Arrhenius equation. The equation was first proposed by the Dutch chemist J. H. van 't Hoff in 1884; five years later in 1889, the Swedish chemist Svante Arrhenius provided a physical justification and interpretation for it.
- Auger effect. First discovered by Lise Meitner in 1922 and then, independently, in 1923 by Pierre Victor Auger.

== B ==
- Bailey–Borwein–Plouffe formula was discovered by Simon Plouffe, who has since expressed regret at having to share credit for his discovery.
- Bell numbers have been studied since the 19th century and even medieval Japan, but are named after Eric Temple Bell who wrote about them in the 1930s.
- Bellman–Ford algorithm for computing the shortest-length path, proposed by Alfonso Shimbel, who presented the algorithm in 1954, but named after Richard Bellman and Lester Ford Jr., who published equivalent forms in 1956 and 1958.
- Benford's law, named after physicist Frank Benford, who stated it in 1938, although it had been previously stated by Simon Newcomb in 1881.
- Bertrand's ballot theorem proved using André's reflection method, which states the probability that the winning candidate in an election stays in the lead throughout the count. It was first published by W. A. Whitworth in 1878, nine years before Joseph Louis François Bertrand; Désiré André's proof did not use reflection, though reflection is now the method commonly taught.
- The Bessemer process was discovered by William Kelly in 1851. Henry Bessemer was the first to obtain a patent in 1855.
- The Bethe–Salpeter equation (named after Hans Bethe and Edwin Salpeter), which describes the bound states of a two-body system in quantum field theory. The equation was first published by Yoichiro Nambu, but without derivation.
- Betteridge's law of headlines, stating that when a headline asks a (yes-no) question, the answer is no. Considered "an old truism among journalists", it was well known before Betteridge wrote about it in 2009.
- Betz' law, which shows the maximum attainable energy efficiency of a wind turbine, was discovered first by Frederick W. Lanchester. It was subsequently independently rediscovered by Albert Betz and also Nikolai Zhukovsky.
- The Bhatia–Davis inequality, which provides an upper bound on the variance of a distribution, is named after Rajendra Bhatia and Chandler Davis who formulated the inequality in 2000. However, it had already been found by Jacob Muilwijk in 1966.
- The Bilinski dodecahedron appears in a 1752 book by John Lodge Cowley but is named after Stanko Bilinski, who rediscovered it in 1960.
- The Black–Scholes model postulating a geometric Brownian motion as a model for stock market returns, credited to the 1973 academic papers of Fischer Black, Myron Scholes and Robert C. Merton, was first proposed by Paul Samuelson in 1965, and refined further in work with Merton in 1969.
- Blount's disease was described independently by C. Mau (1923) and Harald Nilsonne (1929), both writing in German, before it was described in English by Walter Putnam Blount (1937).
- Bode's law of 1772, stating that the distances of the planets from the sun follow a simple arithmetical rule, was first stated by Johann Titius in 1766, not Johann Elert Bode.
- The Bonferroni correction is named after Italian mathematician Carlo Emilio Bonferroni for its use of Bonferroni inequalities. However, its development is often credited to Olive Jean Dunn, who described the procedure's application to confidence intervals.
- Boyce–Codd normal form, a normal form used in database normalization. The definition of what we now know as BCNF appeared in a paper by Ian Heath in 1971. Date writes:
  Since that definition predated Boyce and Codd's own definition by some three years, it seems to me that BCNF ought by rights to be called Heath normal form. But it isn't.
- Boyle's law, which stipulates the reciprocal relation between the pressure and the volume of a gas, was first noted by Richard Towneley and Henry Power. In France, the law is known as Mariotte's law, after Edme Mariotte, who published his results later than Boyle, but crucially added that the relation holds only when temperature is kept constant.
- Bradley–Terry model, one of the most popular models for Pairwise comparison, first described by Ernst Zermelo in 1929.
- Braess's paradox, that adding one or more roads to a road network can cause overall traffic flow through it to slow down, was first discovered by Arthur Pigou in 1920.
- Brayton Cycle, as quoted from Wikipedia itself: The engine cycle is named after George Brayton (1830–1892), the American engineer who developed it originally for use in piston engines, although it was originally proposed and patented by Englishman John Barber in 1791.
- Brus equation named after Louis E. Brus. Proposed a few years earlier by Alexander Efros.
- Burnside's lemma, a counting technique in group theory, was discovered by Augustin Louis Cauchy, or possibly others. William Burnside originally attributed it to Ferdinand Georg Frobenius. Ironically, Burnside made many original contributions to group theory, and Burnside's Lemma is sometimes jokingly referred to as "the lemma that is not Burnside's".
- Buridan's ass originates from the Persian philosopher Al-Ghazali. The version popularised by Jean Buridan also does not include the eponymous donkey.

== C ==
- Cantor–Bernstein–Schröder theorem (also known by other variations, such as Schröder-Bernstein theorem) first proved by Richard Dedekind
- Cantor set, discovered in 1874 by Henry John Stephen Smith and introduced by German mathematician Georg Cantor 1883.
- Carmichael number: Václav Šimerka listed the first seven Carmichael numbers in 1885; they are named after Robert Daniel Carmichael who subsequently discovered the first one in 1910.
- Cartan matrices, first investigated by Wilhelm Killing.
- Cardano's formula, the solution to general cubic equations. Cardano stated that it was discovered by Scipione del Ferro, who passed the knowledge to his student Antonio Maria Fior. Around 1535 Niccolò Fontana Tartaglia learned of this from Fior and re-derived the formula for the cubic, which he later shared with Cardano.
- Cassegrain reflector, named after a design published in 1672 which has been attributed to Laurent Cassegrain, but was already known to Bonaventura Cavalieri in 1632 and Marin Mersenne in 1636.
- Cartesian duality: Named for René Descartes, but Teresa of Avila and her contemporaries wrote about similar methods of philosophical exploration eight to ten years before Descartes was born.
- Cavendish balance for measuring the universal gravitational constant, first devised and constructed by John Michell.
- The Cayley–Hamilton theorem was proven for the general case by Ferdinand Frobenius.
- Chandrasekhar limit, the mass upper limit of a white dwarf, was first derived by Wilhelm Anderson and E. C. Stoner, and later improved by Subrahmanyan Chandrasekhar.
- Chebyshev's inequality guarantees that, for a wide class of probability distributions, no more than a certain fraction of values can be more than a certain distance from the mean. It was first formulated by his friend and colleague Irénée-Jules Bienaymé in 1853 and proved by Chebyshev in 1867.
- Chernoff bound, a bound on the tail distribution of sums of independent random variables, named for Herman Chernoff but due to Herman Rubin.
- Cobb–Douglas, a production function named after Paul H. Douglas and Charles W Cobb, developed earlier by Philip Wicksteed.
- Cooley–Tukey algorithm, named after J. W. Cooley and John Tukey, but invented 160 years earlier in 1805 by Carl Friedrich Gauss.
- Coriolis force which was previously recognized by others but was first mathematically described in an 1835 paper by Gaspard-Gustave de Coriolis
- Curie point, a critical temperature of phase change in ferromagnetism, named for Pierre Curie, who reported it in his thesis in 1895, but the phenomenon was found by Claude Pouillet before 1832.
- Currying, a technique for transforming an n-arity function to a chain of functions. Named after Haskell Curry who had attributed its earlier discovery to Moses Schönfinkel, though the principle can be traced back to work in 1893 by Gottlob Frege.

== D ==
- Deming cycle of continuous improvement. Deming himself always referred to it as the "Shewhart cycle".
- De Morgan's laws of logic, transformation rules of propositional logic. Named after 19th-century British mathematician Augustus De Morgan, but already known to medieval philosophers such as Jean Buridan.
- Dunning-Kruger Effect was early warned by Bertrand Russell when he stated that "the fundamental problem with the world is that the stupid are cocksure while the intelligent are full of doubt".
- Dyson spheres are named after Freeman Dyson, but Dyson himself credited the original idea to Olaf Stapledon.

== E ==
- Euler's number: the discovery of the constant itself is credited to Jacob Bernoulli, but it is named after Leonhard Euler.
- Euler's formula: an equivalent formula was proved by Roger Cotes 30 years before Euler published his proof.

== F ==
- Fadeev–Popov ghosts, and their role in quantizing gauge theories, were first discovered by Richard Feynman. The second known work to make use of them was by Bryce DeWitt. Two weeks later, Ludwig Faddeev and Victor Popov published their work on the path integral treatment of these ghosts, leading Gerard 't Hooft and Martinus Veltman to choose their now standard name.
- Farey sequence. Cauchy published the proof to a conjecture put forth by Farey. Unknown to both men, similar results had been published earlier by Charles Haros.
- Fermi's golden rule, a quantum mechanical calculation, was discovered by Paul Dirac.
- The Fermi paradox, stated (in an unpublished work) by Konstantin Tsiolkovsky in 1933, long before Fermi. Tsiolkovsky, in turn, stated that others had already considered this question.
- The Floyd–Warshall algorithm for finding shortest paths in a weighted graph is named after Robert Floyd and Stephen Warshall who independently published papers about it in 1962. However, Bernard Roy had previously published an equivalent algorithm in 1959.
- The Fraunhofer lines in the solar spectrum were first noted by William Hyde Wollaston twelve years before they were rediscovered and studied systematically by Joseph von Fraunhofer.
- Fresnel lens. The idea of creating a thinner, lighter lens by making it with separate sections mounted in a frame is often attributed to Georges-Louis Leclerc.
- Frobenius elements in a Galois group of global fields were first created by Dedekind.
- Fibonacci numbers. Fibonacci was not the first to discover the famous sequence. They existed in Indian mathematics since 200 BC (Fibonacci gave the series in 1202 AD).

== G ==
- Galileo's paradox: the property of infinite sets was known to Duns Scotus.
- Gauss's law: first described by Joseph Louis Lagrange in 1773, over half a century before Gauss.
- Gauss's theorem: first proved by Ostrogradsky in 1831.
- Gaussian distribution: the normal distribution was introduced by Abraham de Moivre in 1733, but named after Carl Friedrich Gauss who began using it in 1794.
- Gaussian elimination: was already in well-known textbooks such as Thomas Simpson's when Gauss in 1809 remarked that he used "common elimination."
- Gibbs phenomenon: named for Josiah Willard Gibbs who published in 1901. First discovered by Henry Wilbraham in 1851.
- Goodhart's law, with several earlier variations, like Campbell's law.
- The Graetz circuit, also known as the diode bridge, was invented and patented in 1896 by Karol Pollak a year before it was published by Leo Graetz.
- The Graham escapement is often erroneously credited to English clockmaker George Graham but it was actually invented by astronomer Richard Towneley.
- The Gregorian telescope is named after James Gregory, who published it in 1663, but was already known to Bonaventura Cavalieri in 1632 and Marin Mersenne in 1636.
- Gresham's law was described by Nicolaus Copernicus in 1519, the year of Thomas Gresham's birth.
- Grimm's law, the first systemic sound change to be described, was first noted by Friedrich von Schlegel in 1806 and expanded by Rasmus Rask in 1818 before being extended by, and named after, Jacob Grimm in 1822.
- Gröbner basis: the theory was developed by Bruno Buchberger, who named them after his advisor, Wolfgang Gröbner.

== H ==
- Halley's Comet was observed by astronomers since at least 240 BC, but named after Edmond Halley who computed its orbit and accurately predicted its return.
- Hasse diagrams were used by Henri Gustav Vogt three years before the birth of Helmut Hasse.
- Heaviside layer was named for Oliver Heaviside although work by Arthur E. Kennelly preceded Heaviside's proposal by several months.
- Hermite polynomials are named after Charles Hermite, though were studied earlier by Laplace and Chebyshev.
- Higgs field is named after Peter Higgs but was first theorized by Robert Brout and François Englert, albeit not published before Higgs had submitted his own paper.
- Heron's formula is named after Hero of Alexandria but is due to Archimedes.
- Hodrick–Prescott filter was popularized in the field of economics in the 1990s by economists Robert J. Hodrick and Nobel Memorial Prize winner Edward C. Prescott. However, it was first proposed much earlier by E. T. Whittaker in 1923.
- Holt graph, the smallest half-transitive graph, was found by Peter G. Doyle five years before Derek F. Holt.
- Hubble's law was derived by Georges Lemaître two years before Edwin Hubble.

== I ==
- Ising model was invented by Wilhelm Lenz, but given to his student Ernst Ising to study.

== J ==
- Jacobson's organ was first discovered by Frederik Ruysch before 1732.
- Jordan's Law (in the sense of sister species often being allopatric): Jordan himself gives Wagner credit for earlier observation of this pattern.

== K ==
- Kapteyn's Star catalogued by Jacobus Kapteyn in 1898 was previously catalogued by B. A. Gould in 1873.
- Kasiski analysis: invented by Charles Babbage who recorded it in his diary but didn't otherwise publish it.
- Kepler's Supernova was first observed by Lodovico delle Colombe several days before Johannes Kepler
- Killing form: invented by Élie Cartan
- Kort nozzle was developed first by Luigi Stipa (1931) and later by Ludwig Kort (1934)
- Kuiper belt: theoretically described by a number of astronomers before Gerard Kuiper; Kuiper theorized that such a belt no longer existed.
- Kodály method was conceived and developed for music teaching by Jenő Ádám; a pupil of Kodály.
- Kolakoski sequence is named after William Kolakoski who described it in 1965, but Rufus Oldenburger previously discussed it in 1939.
- Kronecker product: Johann Georg Zehfuss already in 1858 described the matrix operation we now know as the Kronecker product

== L ==
- L'Hôpital's rule to calculate the limit of quotient of functions at a point were both functions converge to 0 (or both converge to infinity) is named after Guillaume de l'Hôpital, but is generally believed to have been discovered by Johann Bernoulli.
- Lamarckism is generally used to refer to the idea of inheritance of acquired characteristics or soft inheritance, but the idea predates Jean-Baptiste Lamarck and was not the central part of his theory of transmutation of species.
- Laplace–Runge–Lenz vector was first discovered as a conserved quantity by Jakob Hermann and Johann Bernoulli.
- Leibniz formula for π was first discovered by 15th-century Indian mathematician Madhava of Sangamagrama, but it is named after Gottfried Leibniz after the latter discovered it independently 300 years later.
- Lexis diagram is named for Wilhelm Lexis but was previously theorized by Gustav Zeuner and Otto Brasche.
- Lhermitte's sign in neurology, the "barber chair phenomenon" was first described by Pierre Marie and Chatelin. French neurologist Jean Lhermitte published his first report three years later.
- The Liebig condenser, which Justus von Liebig popularized, was attributed to Göttling by Liebig himself, but had already been developed independently by Poisonnier, Weigel, and Gadolin.
- Liebig's law of the minimum was first developed by Carl Sprengel and only popularized by Justus von Liebig.
- Linus's law: named for Linus Torvalds, but actually described by Eric S. Raymond in The Cathedral and the Bazaar.

== M ==
- Maxwell's equations. The modern form of the equations in their most common formulation is credited to Oliver Heaviside, based on James Clerk Maxwell's original work.
- Madelung rule, describing the order in which electron orbitals are filled, named after Erwin Madelung but first discovered by Charles Janet.
- Magellanic Clouds, while observed by Antonio Pigafetta on one of Magellan's voyages there were previous reports made by 16th century Italian authors Peter Martyr d'Anghiera and Andrea Corsali and earlier reports by Arabic astronomers.
- Matthew effect, named by Robert K. Merton after the writer of the Gospel of Matthew quoting the words of Jesus.
- Meadow's law, the formulation that one cot death in a family is tragic, two suspicious, and three murder, originally described by D.J. and V.J.M. Di Maio.
- Metropolis–Hastings algorithm. The algorithm was named after Nicholas Metropolis, who was the director of the Theoretical Division of Los Alamos National Laboratory at the time of writing the paper Equation of State Calculations by Fast Computing Machines. However, Metropolis did not contribute to that study in any way, as confirmed by various sources. The research problem was proposed by Augusta H. Teller and solved by Marshall N. Rosenbluth and Arianna W. Rosenbluth. Furthermore, according to Roy Glauber and Emilio Segrè, the original algorithm was invented by Enrico Fermi and reinvented by Stan Ulam.
- Moore's Law

== N ==
- Newton's first and second laws of mechanics were known and proposed in separate ways by Galileo, Hooke and Huygens before Newton did in his Philosophiæ Naturalis Principia Mathematica. Newton owns the discovery of only the third one.
- Norman's law, proposed by Donald Norman, is a general restatement of Stigler's Law, "No saying or pronouncement is named after its originator." This law was named for Norman as an example of Stigler's Law – which was, itself, not named after its originator.
- Norton's theorem was published in November 1926 by Hans Ferdinand Mayer and independently discovered by Edward Lawry Norton who presented it in an internal Bell Labs technical report, dated November 1926.
- Nyquist–Shannon sampling theorem. The name Nyquist–Shannon sampling theorem honours Harry Nyquist and Claude Shannon, but the theorem was also previously discovered by E. T. Whittaker (published in 1915) and Shannon cited Whittaker's paper in his work. (from Wikipedia)

== O ==
- The Oort cloud around the Solar System was first postulated by Ernst Öpik in 1932 and independently introduced by Jan Oort in 1960.
- Olbers' paradox was formulated by Kepler in the 17th century, long before Olbers was born.

== P ==
- Padé approximant: named after and developed by Henri Padé around 1890, but was first introduced by Ferdinand Georg Frobenius.
- Pascal's triangle: studied by and named for Blaise Pascal, but constructed several times before him independently.
- Pearson's Coefficient of Correlation: was originally derived by Auguste Bravais and published in 1846.
- Pell's equation, studied in ancient India but mistakenly attributed to John Pell by Leonhard Euler. Apparently Euler confused Lord Brouncker (first European mathematician to find a general solution of the equation) with Pell.
- Penrose triangle, an impossible object first created by the Swedish artist Oscar Reutersvärd in 1934. The mathematician Roger Penrose independently devised and popularised it in the 1950s.
- Petersen graph as an example in graph theory, put forward by Julius Petersen in 1898, though it previously appeared in a paper by A. B. Kempe (1886).
- Pfizer vaccine, a COVID-19 mRNA vaccine developed by BioNTech. Due to its small size, BioNTech partnered with the pharmaceutical companies Pfizer and Fosun for support with clinical trials, logistics and manufacturing. The vaccine's clinical name is BNT162b2 and it is currently marketed under the name Comirnaty.
- Platonic solids were described earlier by Theaetetus, and some of them even earlier, by the Pythagoreans.
- Playfair's axiom, an alternative to Euclid's fifth postulate on parallel lines, first stated by Proclus in the 5th century AD but named after John Playfair after he included it in his 1795 book Elements of Geometry and credited it to William Ludlam.
- Playfair cipher, invented by Charles Wheatstone in 1854, but named after Lord Playfair who promoted its use.
- Poe's law, formally stated by Nathan Poe in 2005, but following Internet norms going back as far as Jerry Schwarz in 1983.
- The Poincaré disk model and the Poincaré half-plane model of hyperbolic geometry are named after Henri Poincaré who studied them in 1882. However, Eugenio Beltrami published a paper on these models previously in 1868.
- Poisson distribution: described by Siméon Denis Poisson in 1837, though the result had already been given in 1711-21 by Abraham de Moivre.
- Poisson spot: predicted by Fresnel's theory of diffraction, named after Poisson, who ridiculed the theory, especially its prediction of the existence of this spot. It is also called the Arago spot as François Arago observed it or the Fresnel bright spot after Augustin-Jean Fresnel's theory, though it had already been observed by Joseph-Nicolas Delisle and Giacomo F. Maraldi a century earlier.
- Prim's algorithm, developed in 1930 by the Czech mathematician Vojtěch Jarník and independently rediscovered by Prim in 1957.
- Prinzmetal angina, also known as variant angina, referring to angina (chest pain) caused by vasospasm of the coronary arteries. Described twice in the 1930s before being published by Prinzmetal in 1959.
- Pythagorean theorem, named after the mathematician Pythagoras, although it was known before him to Babylonian mathematicians (it is not known if the Babylonians possessed a proof of the result; nor is it known whether Pythagoras proved the result).

== R ==
- The Reynolds number in fluid mechanics was introduced by George Stokes, but is named after Osborne Reynolds, who popularized its use.
- Richards equation is attributed to Richards in his 1931 publication, but was earlier introduced by Richardson in 1922 in his book "Weather prediction by numerical process." (Cambridge University press. p. 262) as pointed out by John Knight and Peter Raats in "The contributions of Lewis Fry Richardson to drainage theory, soil physics, and the soil-plant-atmosphere continuum" EGU General Assembly 2016.
- Russell's paradox is a paradox in set theory that Bertrand Russell discovered and published in 1901. However, Ernst Zermelo had independently discovered the paradox in 1899.

== S ==
- The Sankey diagram was invented by Charles Joseph Minard
- The Schottky diode was neither discovered by Schottky nor its operation correctly explained by him. The actual nature of the metal–semiconductor junction was noted by Hans Bethe.
- The Schröder–Bernstein theorem in set theory was first stated without proof by Georg Cantor and first proved by Richard Dedekind
- Shuey's equation from 1985, which is an approximation of the Zoeprittz Equation first published in 1919.
- Simpson's paradox, a term introduced by Colin R. Blyth in 1972; but Edward Simpson did not actually discover this statistical paradox.
- The Simson line in geometry is named for Robert Simson, but cannot be found in Simson's works. Instead, it was first discovered by William Wallace in 1797.
- The Smith chart in radio frequency engineering is named after Phillip Hagar Smith, who published about it in 1939. However, it was independently invented by Tosaku Mizuhashi in 1937 and Amiel R. Volpert in 1939.
- Snell's law of refraction, named after Willebrord Snellius, a Dutch scientist, also known as Descartes law of refraction (after René Descartes) was discovered by Ibn Sahl.
- the Snellius–Pothenot problem was solved by Willebrord Snellius only, and restated by Laurent Pothenot 75 years later
- Steiner triple systems named for Jakob Steiner's work in 1754 were first found by Thomas Kirkman in 1746–1750.
- Stigler's law, attributed by Stephen Stigler himself to Robert K. Merton, though the phenomenon had previously been noted by others.
- Stirling's approximation, which was presaged in published work by Abraham de Moivre.
- Stokes's theorem discovered by Lord Kelvin
- Student's t-distribution, previously derived by Helmert and Lüroth.

== T ==
- The tetralogy of Fallot was described in 1672 by Niels Stensen, but named after Étienne-Louis Arthur Fallot who also described it in 1888.
- Taylor's law in ecology was discovered by H. Fairfield Smith in 1938 but named after L. R. Taylor who rediscovered it in 1961.
- Thévenin's theorem in circuit theory was discovered by Hermann von Helmholtz in 1853 but named after Léon Charles Thévenin who rediscovered it in 1883.
- Tai's model was known in antiquity.
- Tsiolkovsky rocket equation was independently arrived at by William Moore in 1810, Konstantin Tsiolkovsky in 1903, Robert Goddard in 1912, and Herman Oberth about 1920.

== V ==
- Venn diagrams are named after John Venn, who popularized them in the 1880s, but Leonhard Euler had already introduced them in 1768.
- Vigenère cipher was originally described by Giovan Battista Bellaso in his 1553 book La cifra del. Sig. Giovan Battista Bellaso, but later misattributed to Blaise de Vigenère in the 19th century.
- The Von Neumann architecture of computer hardware is misattributed to John von Neumann because he wrote a preliminary report called "First Draft of a Report on the EDVAC" that did not include the names of the inventors: John Mauchly and J. Presper Eckert
- Voronoi diagrams are named after Georgy Voronoy, who defined and studied the general n-dimensional case in 1908, but have already been used by Descartes (1644), Lejeune Dirichlet (1850) and Snow (1854).

== W ==
- Wang tiles were hypothesized by Hao Wang not to exist, but an example was constructed by his student Robert Berger.
- Wheatstone bridge, an electrical measuring instrument invented by Samuel Hunter Christie in 1833, but named after Sir Charles Wheatstone who improved and popularized it in 1843.
- Widmanstätten patterns, named after Count Alois von Beckh Widmanstätten in 1808, but previously reported by William Thomson (mineralogist) in 1804.
- Wike's law of low odd primes, a principle of design of experiments, was stated by Sir Ronald A. Fisher in 1935 but named by Edwin Wike in 1973.
- Wilson Cycle, named in 1974 by Kevin C. A. Burke after the Canadian geologist J. Tuzo Wilson for Wilson's 1966 proposal that the Atlantic Ocean had previously closed and then opened again, a theory that the Swiss geologist Émile Argand had proposed in the 1920s.

== Y ==
- Yagi–Uda antenna, a successful and popular beam antenna, whose primary inventor was Shintaro Uda, but which was popularized by, and formerly popularly named for, his collaborator Hidetsugu Yagi.

== Z ==
- Zipf's law states that given some corpus of natural language utterances, the frequency of any word is inversely proportional to its rank in the frequency table. The law is named after George Kingsley Zipf, an early twentieth century American linguist. Zipf popularized Zipf's law and sought to explain it, though he did not claim to have originated it. Jean-Baptiste Estoup was the first person to note this regularity in word frequencies.

== See also ==
- List of misnamed theorems
- List of multiple discoveries
- List of scientific priority disputes
