= List of misnamed theorems =

This is a list of misnamed theorems in mathematics. It includes theorems (and lemmas, corollaries, conjectures, laws, and perhaps even the odd object) that are well known in mathematics, but which are not named for the originator. That is, the items on this list illustrate Stigler's law of eponymy (which is not, of course, due to Stephen Stigler, who credits Robert K Merton).

== Applied mathematics ==
Benford's law

- Benford's law. This was first stated in 1881 by Simon Newcomb, and rediscovered in 1938 by Frank Benford. The first rigorous formulation and proof seems to be due to Ted Hill in 1988.; see also the contribution by Persi Diaconis.
- Bertrand's ballot theorem. This result concerning the probability that the winner of an election was ahead at each step of ballot counting was first published by W. A. Whitworth in 1878, but named after Joseph Louis François Bertrand who rediscovered it in 1887. A common proof uses André's reflection method, though the proof by Désiré André did not use any reflections.

== Algebra ==
- Burnside's lemma. This was stated and proved without attribution in Burnside's 1897 textbook, but it had previously been discussed by Augustin Cauchy, in 1845, and by Georg Frobenius in 1887.
- Cayley–Hamilton theorem. The theorem was first proved in the easy special case of 2×2 matrices by Cayley, and later for the case of 4×4 matrices by Hamilton. But it was only proved in general by Frobenius in 1878.
- Hölder's inequality. This inequality was first established by Leonard James Rogers, and published in 1888. Otto Hölder discovered it independently, and published it in 1889.
- Marden's theorem. This theorem relating the location of the zeros of a complex cubic polynomial to the zeros of its derivative was named by Dan Kalman after Kalman read it in a 1966 book by Morris Marden, who had first written about it in 1945. But, as Marden had himself written, its original proof was by Jörg Siebeck in 1864.
- Pólya enumeration theorem. This was proven in 1927 in a difficult paper by J. H. Redfield. Despite the prominence of the venue (the American Journal of Mathematics), the paper was overlooked. Eventually, the theorem was independently rediscovered in 1936 by George Pólya. Not until 1960 did Frank Harary unearth the much earlier paper by Redfield. See for historical and other information.

== Analysis ==
- Frobenius theorem. This fundamental theorem was stated and proved in 1840 by Feodor Deahna. Even though Frobenius cited Deahna's paper in his own 1875 paper, it became known after Frobenius, not Deahna. See for a historical review.
- L'Hôpital's rule. This rule first appeared in l'Hôpital's book L'Analyse des Infiniment Petits pour l'Intelligence des Lignes Courbes in 1696. The rule is believed to be the work of Johann Bernoulli since l'Hôpital, a nobleman, paid Bernoulli a retainer of 300 francs per year to keep him updated on developments in calculus and to solve problems he had. See L'Analyse des Infiniment Petits pour l'Intelligence des Lignes Courbes and reference therein.
- Maclaurin series. The Maclaurin series was named after Colin Maclaurin, a professor in Edinburgh, who published this special case of the Taylor series in 1742, but never claimed to have discovered it.
- Poincaré lemma. This was mentioned in 1886 by Henri Poincaré, but was first proved in a series of 1889 papers by the distinguished Italian mathematician Vito Volterra. Nonetheless, it has become known after Poincaré. See for the twisted history of this lemma.
- Stokes' theorem. It is named after Sir George Gabriel Stokes (1819–1903), although the first known statement of the theorem is by William Thomson (Lord Kelvin) and appears in a letter of his to Stokes. The theorem acquired its name from Stokes' habit of including it in the Cambridge prize examinations. In 1854 he asked his students to prove the theorem in an examination; it is not known if anyone was able to do so.

== Geometry and topology ==
- Ceva's theorem. The oldest extant proof can be found in Yusuf al-Mu'taman ibn Hud's 11th century Kitab al-Istikmal (Book of Perfection), about six centuries before Giovanni Ceva's 1678 De lineis rectis (On straight lines).
- Cramer's paradox. This was first noted by Colin Maclaurin in 1720, and then rediscovered by Leonhard Euler in 1748 (whose paper was not published for another two years, as Euler wrote his papers faster than his printers could print them). It was also discussed by Gabriel Cramer in 1750, who independently suggested the essential idea needed for the resolution, although providing a rigorous proof remained an outstanding open problem for much of the 19th century. Even though Cramer had cited Maclaurin, the paradox became known after Cramer rather than Maclaurin. Georges Halphen, Arthur Cayley, and several other mathematicians contributed to the earliest more or less correct proof. See for an excellent review.
- Heine–Borel theorem. This theorem was proved in 1872 by Émile Borel, not by Eduard Heine. Borel used techniques similar to those that Heine used to prove that continuous functions on closed intervals are uniformly continuous. Heine's name was attached because Schönflies noticed the similarity in Heine's and Borel's approaches. In fact, the theorem was first proved in 1852 by Peter Gustav Lejeune Dirichlet, but Lejeune Dirichlet's lecture notes were not published until 1904.
- Models of hyperbolic geometry. "By one of the injustices of nomenclature that are so common in mathematics, the three models – which could appropriately be called Riemann-Beltrami, Liouville-Beltrami, and Cayley-Beltrami models – are usually known as the Poincaré disk model, the Poincaré half-plane model and the Klein disk model."
- Morrie's law. The name is due to physicist Richard Feynman, who used to refer to the identity under that name. Feynman picked that name because he had learned the law during his childhood from a boy with the name Morrie Jacobs.
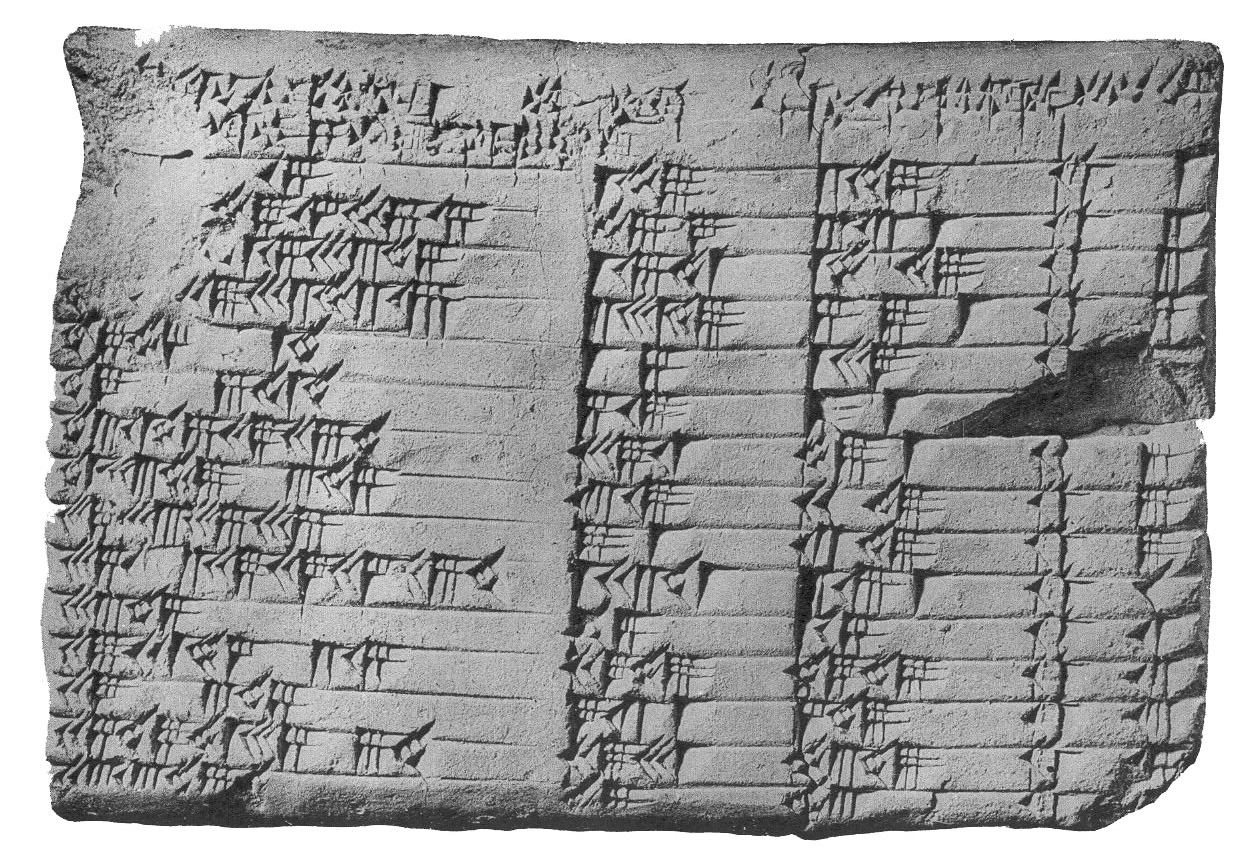
- Plimpton 322, a tablet that contained several Pythagorean triples
  Pythagoras' theorem. This was known to ancient Mesopotamian mathematicians over one thousand years before Pythagoras was born.

== Number theory ==
- Bézout's theorem. The statement may have been made first by Isaac Newton in 1665. The matter of a proof was taken up by Colin MacLaurin (c. 1720) and Leonhard Euler as well as Étienne Bézout (c. 1750). However, Bézout's "proof" was incorrect. The first correct proof seems to be due mostly to Georges-Henri Halphen in the 1870s.
- Cramer's rule. It is named after Gabriel Cramer (1704–1752), who published the rule in his 1750 Introduction à l'analyse des lignes courbes algébriques, although Colin Maclaurin also published the method in his 1748 Treatise of Algebra (and probably knew of the method as early as 1729).
- Pell's equation. The solution of the equation x^{2} − dy^{2} = 1, where x and y are unknown positive integers and where d is a known positive integer which is not a perfect square, is ascribed to John Pell. It seems to have been discovered by Fermat, who set it as a challenge problem in 1657. The first European solution is found in a joint work in 1658 by John Wallis and Lord Brouncker; in 1668, a shorter solution was given in an edition of a third mathematician's work by Pell; see ref. The first rigorous proof may be due to Lagrange. The misnomer apparently came about when Euler confused Brouncker and Pell; see for an extensive account of the history of this equation.

== Set theory ==
- Zorn's lemma is named for Max Zorn. Much work on the theorem now known as Zorn's lemma, and on several closely related formulations such as the Hausdorff maximal principle, was done between 1907 and 1940 by Zorn, Brouwer, Hausdorff, Kuratowski, R. L. Moore, and others. But the particular theorem now known as "Zorn's lemma" was never proved by Zorn, and in any event Zorn's results were anticipated by Kuratowski. The theorem was discovered by Chevalley in 1936, and published and attributed to Zorn by him in Bourbaki's Théorie des Ensembles in 1939. A very similar result was anticipated by S. Bochner in 1928.

== See also ==
- List of examples of Stigler's law
- List of multiple discoveries
- List of theorems
- Matthew effect
