= Dmitry Mirimanoff =

Russian-Swiss mathematician (1861–1945)

- Дми́трий Семёнович Мирима́нов
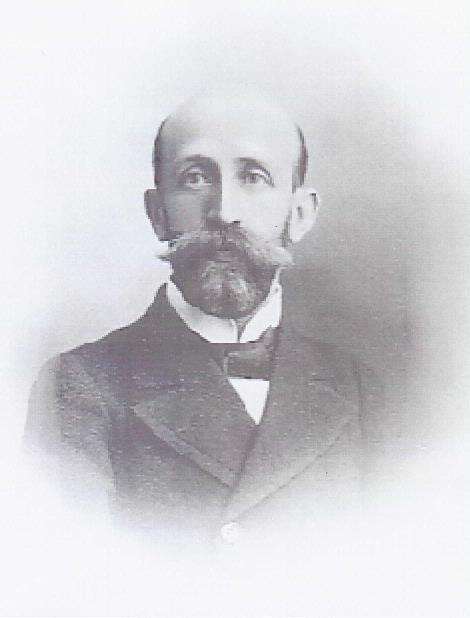
- Dmitry Mirimanoff
- Born: Dmitry Semionovitch Mirimanoff; 13 September 1861; Pereslavl-Zalessky, Russian Empire
- Died: 5 January 1945 (aged 83); Geneva, Switzerland
- Citizenship: Swiss (since 1926)
- Occupation: doctor of mathematical sciences
- Years active: 1897–1945
- Notable work: mathematic publications
- Spouse: Malvina Geneviève Valentine Adriansen (1897–?)
- Children: 2
- Relatives: Sophia and Lydia Mirimanoff (sisters)

Dmitry Semionovitch Mirimanoff (Russian: Дми́трий Семёнович Мирима́нов; 13 September 1861, Pereslavl-Zalessky, Russia – 5 January 1945, Geneva, Switzerland) was a member of the Moscow Mathematical Society in 1897. And later became a doctor of mathematical sciences in 1900, in Geneva, and taught at the universities of Geneva and Lausanne.

Mirimanoff made notable contributions to axiomatic set theory and to number theory (relating specifically to Fermat's Last Theorem, on which he corresponded with Albert Einstein before the First World War). In 1917, he introduced, though not as explicitly as John von Neumann later, the cumulative hierarchy of sets and the notion of von Neumann ordinals; although he introduced a notion of regular (and well-founded set) he did not consider regularity as an axiom, but also explored what is now called non-well-founded set theory and had an emergent idea of what is now called bisimulation.

== Life ==
Dmitry Semionovitch was born in Pereslavl-Zalessky, Russia, on 13 September 1861. His parents were Semion Mirimanovitch Mirimanoff (Russian: Семён Мирима́нович Мирима́нов) and Maria Dmitrievna Rudakova (Russian: Мари́я Дми́триевна Рудакова).

Around 1885, Dmitry Mirimanoff met a French woman, Malvina Geneviève Valentine Adriansen in Nice. Geneviève Adriansen learnt Russian and accepted Russian Orthodox Christianity. They married in Geneva, Switzerland on 25 October 1897 and had two sons: Alexander (later Alexandre) Dmitrievitch Mirimanoff (Russian: Алекса́ндр Дми́триевич Мирима́нов), born in Oranienbaum (now Lomonossov) in 1898, and Andreï (later André) Dmitrievitch Mirimanoff (Russian: Андрей Дми́триевич Мирима́нов), born in Geneva in 1902.

The family lived in Russia (first, in Moscow, then in St Petersburg) until 1900 when they moved to Geneva (in search of a better climate for Dmitry Mirimanoff's bad health). After the 1917 revolutions they never visited Russia, although Dmitry's sisters Sophia and Lydia remained there. Dmitry Mirimanoff became a Swiss citizen on 17 September 1926. He later died on 5 January 1945 in Geneva.

== Work ==
=== Set theory ===
Mirimanoff in a 1917 paper introduced the concept of well-founded set and the notion of rank of a set. Mirimanoff called a set x "regular" (French: "ordinaire") if every descending chain x ∋ x_{1} ∋ x_{2} ∋ ... is finite. Mirimanoff however did not consider his notion of regularity (well-foundedness) as an axiom to be observed by all sets; in later papers Mirimanoff also explored what are now called non-well-founded sets ("extraordinaire" in Mirimanoff's terminology).

=== Reflection method ===
In 2008, Marc Renault published an article in which he pointed out that it is Dmitry Mirimanoff who should be credited for creating "the reflection method" for solving Bertrand's ballot problem, not Désiré André to whom it had been long credited. Therefore, Donald Knuth, who has read Renault's article, will credit Mirimanoff instead of André in future printings of Volume 1 of his monograph The Art of Computer Programming.

== See also ==
- Mirimanoff's congruence
- Wieferich prime
- Mirimanoff prime
