= Fuss–Catalan number =

Type of number in combinatorial mathematics and statistics

In combinatorial mathematics and statistics, the Fuss–Catalan numbers are numbers of the form

$$A_m(p,r)\equiv\frac{r}{mp+r}\binom{mp+r}{m} = \frac{r}{m!}\prod_{i=1}^{m-1}(mp+r-i) = r\frac{\Gamma(mp+r)}{\Gamma(1+m)\Gamma(m(p-1)+r+1)}.$$

They are named after N. I. Fuss and Eugène Charles Catalan.

In some publications this equation is sometimes referred to as two-parameter Fuss–Catalan numbers or Raney numbers. The implication is the single-parameter Fuss-Catalan numbers are when $\,r=1\,$ and $\,p=2\,$.

== Uses ==
The Fuss-Catalan represents the number of legal permutations or allowed ways of arranging a number of articles, that is restricted in some way. This means that they are related to the binomial coefficient. The key difference between Fuss-Catalan and the binomial coefficient is that there are no "illegal" arrangement permutations within the binomial coefficient, but there are within Fuss-Catalan. An example of legal and illegal permutations can be better demonstrated by a specific problem such as balanced brackets (see Dyck language).

A general problem is to count the number of balanced brackets (or legal permutations) that a string of m open and m closed brackets forms (total of 2m brackets). By legally arranged, the following rules apply:

- For the sequence as a whole, the number of open brackets must equal the number of closed brackets
- Working along the sequence, the number of open brackets must be greater than the number of closed brackets

As an numeric example how many combinations can 3 pairs of brackets be legally arranged? From the binomial interpretation there are $\tbinom {2m}{m}$ or numerically $\tbinom 63$ = 20 ways of arranging 3 open and 3 closed brackets. However, there are fewer legal combinations than these when all of the above restrictions apply. Evaluating these by hand, there are 5 legal combinations, namely: ()()(); (())(); ()(()); (()()); ((())). This corresponds to the Fuss-Catalan formula when p=2, r=1 which is the Catalan number formula $\tfrac{1}{2m+1}\tbinom{2m+1}{m}$ or $\tfrac{1}{m+1}\tbinom{2m}{m}=\tfrac{1}{4}\tbinom63$=5. By simple subtraction, there are $\tfrac{m}{m+1}\tbinom{2m}{m}$ or $\tfrac34\tbinom63$ =15 illegal combinations. To further illustrate the subtlety of the problem, if one were to persist with solving the problem just using the binomial formula, it would be realised that the 2 rules imply that the sequence must start with an open bracket and finish with a closed bracket. This implies that there are $\tbinom{2m-2}{m-1}$ or $\tbinom42$=6 combinations. This is inconsistent with the above answer of 5, and the missing combination is: ())((), which is illegal and would complete the binomial interpretation.

Whilst the above is a concrete example Catalan numbers, similar problems can be evaluated using Fuss-Catalan formula:

- Computer stack: ways of arranging and completing a computer stack of instructions, each time step 1 instruction is processed and p new instructions arrive randomly. If at the beginning of the sequence there are r instructions outstanding.
- Betting: ways of losing all money when betting. A player has a total stake pot that allows them to make r bets, and plays a game of chance that pays p times the bet stake.
- Tries: Calculating the number of order m tries on n nodes.

== Special cases ==
Below is listed a few formulae, along with a few notable special cases

| General form | Special case |
|---|---|
| $A_{0}(p,r) = 1$ | $A_{0}(p,p) = A_{1}(p,1) = 1$ |
| $A_{1}(p,r) = r$ | $A_{1}(p,p) = A_{2}(p,1) = p$ |
| $A_{2}(p,r) = r(2p+r-1)/2$ | $A_{2}(p,p) = A_{3}(p,1) = p(3p-1)/2$ |
| $A_{3}(p,r) = r(3p+r-1)(3p+r-2)/6$ | $A_{3}(p,p) = A_{4}(p,1) = p(4p-1)(4p-2)/6$ |
| $A_{4}(p,r) = r(4p+r-1)(4p+r-2)(4p+r-3)/24$ | $A_{4}(p,p) = A_{5}(p,1) = p(5p-1)(5p-2)(5p-3)/24$ |

If $p=0$, we recover the binomial coefficients $A_m(0,r){{=}}\binom{r}{m}$

$$A_m(0,1) = 1,1$$;
$$A_m(0,2) = 1,2,1$$;
$$A_m(0,3) = 1,3,3,1$$;
$$A_m(0,4) = 1,4,6,4,1$$.

If $p=1$, Pascal's triangle appears, read along diagonals:

$$A_m(1,1) = 1,1,1,1,1,1,1,1,1,1,\ldots$$;
$$A_m(1,2) = 1,2,3,4,5,6,7,8,9,10,\ldots$$;
$$A_m(1,3) = 1,3,6,10,15,21,28,35,45,55,\ldots$$;
$$A_m(1,4) = 1,4,10,20,35,56,84,120,165,220,\ldots$$;
$$A_m(1,5) = 1,5,15,35,70,126,210,330,495,715,\ldots$$;
$$A_m(1,6) = 1,6,21,56,126,252,462,792,1287,2002,\ldots$$.

== Examples ==
For subindex $m\ge 0$ the numbers are:

Examples with $p=2$:

$A_m(2,1) = 1, 1, 2, 5, 14, 42, 132, 429, 1430, 4862,\ldots$ OEIS: A000108, known as the Catalan Numbers
$$A_m(2,2) = 1, 2, 5, 14, 42, 132, 429, 1430, 4862, 16796, \ldots = A_{m+1}(2,1)$$
$A_m(2,3) = 1, 3, 9, 28, 90, 297, 1001, 3432, 11934, 41990, \ldots$ OEIS: A000245
$A_m(2,4) = 1, 4, 14, 48, 165, 572, 2002, 7072, 25194, 90440,\ldots$ OEIS: A002057

Examples with $p=3$:

$A_m(3,1) = 1, 1, 3, 12, 55, 273, 1428, 7752, 43263, 246675, \ldots$ OEIS: A001764
$A_m(3,2) = 1, 2, 7, 30, 143, 728, 3876, 21318, 120175, 690690,\ldots$ OEIS: A006013
$$A_m(3,3) = 1, 3, 12, 55, 273, 1428, 7752, 43263, 246675, 1430715,\ldots = A_{m+1}(3,1)$$
$A_m(3,4) = 1, 4, 18, 88, 455, 2448, 13566, 76912, 444015, 2601300,\ldots$ OEIS: A006629

Examples with $p=4$:

$A_m(4,1) = 1, 1, 4, 22, 140, 969, 7084, 53820, 420732, 3362260,\ldots$ OEIS: A002293
$A_m(4,2) = 1, 2, 9, 52, 340, 2394, 17710, 135720, 1068012, 8579560,\ldots$ OEIS: A069271
$A_m(4,3) = 1, 3, 15, 91, 612, 4389, 32890, 254475, 2017356, 16301164, \ldots$ OEIS: A006632
$$A_m(4,4) =  1, 4, 22, 140, 969, 7084, 53820, 420732, 3362260, 27343888,\ldots = A_{m+1}(4,1)$$

== Algebra ==
=== Recurrence ===
$A_m(p,r)=A_m(p,r-1)+A_{m-1}(p,p+r-1)$ equation (1)

This means in particular that from

$A_m(p,0)=0$ equation (2)

and

$A_0(p,r)=1$ equation (3)

one can generate all other Fuss–Catalan numbers if p is an integer.

Riordan (see references) obtains a convolution type of recurrence:

$A_m(p,s+r) = \sum_{k=0}^m A_k(p,r)A_{m-k}(p,s)$ equation(4)

=== Generating function ===
Paraphrasing the "Densities of the Raney distributions" paper, let the ordinary generating function with respect to the index m be defined as follows:

$B_{p,r}(z):=\sum_{m=0}^\infty A_m(p,r)z^m$ equation (5).

Looking at equations (1) and (2), when r=1 it follows that

$A_m(p,p)=A_{m+1}(p,1)$ equation (6).

Also note this result can be derived by similar substitutions into the other formulas representation, such as the gamma ratio representation at the top of this article. Using (6) and substituting into (5) an equivalent representation expressed as a generating function can be formulated as

$$B_{p,1}(z) = 1+zB_{p,p}(z)$$.

Finally, extending this result by using Lambert's equivalence

$$B_{p,1}(z)^r=B_{p,r}(z)$$.

The following result can be derived for the ordinary generating function for all the Fuss-Catalan sequences.

$$B_{p,r}(z) = [1+zB_{p,r}(z)^{p/r}]^r$$.

=== Recursion representation ===
Recursion forms of this are as follows: The most obvious form is:

$$A_m(p,r) = \frac{m-1}{m}\frac{\binom{mp+r-1}{m-1}}{\binom{(m-1)p+r-1}{m-2}} A_{m-1}(p,r)$$

Also, a less obvious form is

$$A_m(p,r) = \frac{(m-1)p+r}{m}\frac{\binom{mp+r-1}{p-1}}{\binom{m(p-1)+r}{p-1}} A_{m-1}(p,r)$$

=== Alternate representations ===
In some problems it is easier to use different formula configurations or variations. Below are two examples using just the binomial function:

$$A_m(p,r)\equiv\frac{r}{mp+r}\binom{mp+r}{m} = \frac{r}{m(p-1)+r}\binom{mp+r-1}{m} = \frac{r}{m}\binom{mp+r-1}{m-1}$$

These variants can be converted into a product, gamma or factorial representations too.

== See also ==
- Combinatorics
- Statistics
- Binomial coefficient
- Binomial distribution
- Catalan number
- Dyck language
- Pascal's triangle
