= Catalan's minimal surface =

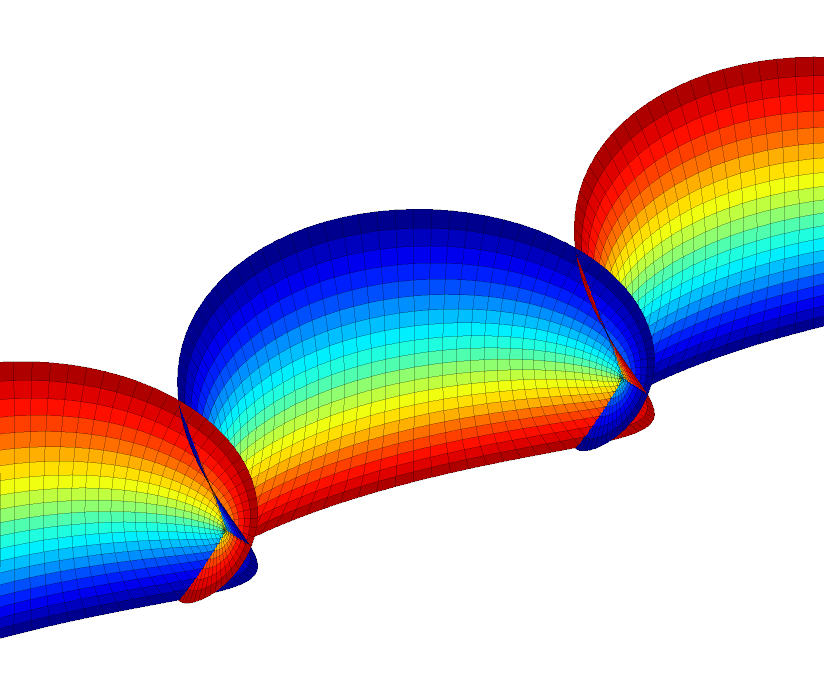
Catalan's minimal surface.

In differential geometry, Catalan's minimal surface is a minimal surface originally studied by Eugène Charles Catalan in 1855.

It has the special property of being the minimal surface that contains a cycloid as a geodesic. It is also swept out by a family of parabolae.

The surface has the mathematical characteristics exemplified by the following parametric equation:

$$\begin{align}
x(u,v) &= u - \sin(u)\cosh(v)\\
y(u,v) &= 1 - \cos(u)\cosh(v)\\
z(u,v) &= 4 \sin(u/2) \sinh(v/2)
\end{align}$$
