= Equable shape =

Shape with the same area and perimeter

Every equable triangle has an inradius of 2.

A two-dimensional equable shape (or perfect shape) is one whose area is numerically equal to its perimeter. For example, a right angled triangle with sides 5, 12 and 13 has area and perimeter both with a unitless numerical value of 30.

== Scaling and units ==
An area cannot be equal to a length except relative to a particular unit of measurement. For example, if shape has an area of 5 square yards and a perimeter of 5 yards, then it has an area of 45 square feet (4.2 m^{2}) and a perimeter of 15 feet (since 3 feet = 1 yard and hence 9 square feet = 1 square yard). Moreover, contrary to what the name implies, changing the size while leaving the shape intact changes an "equable shape" into a non-equable shape. However its common use as GCSE coursework has led to its being an accepted concept. For any shape, there is a similar equable shape: if a shape S has perimeter p and area A, then scaling S by a factor of p/A leads to an equable shape. Alternatively, one may find equable shapes by setting up and solving an equation in which the area equals the perimeter. In the case of the square, for instance, this equation is

$$\displaystyle x^2 = 4x.$$

Solving this yields that x = 4, so a 4 × 4 square is equable.

== Tangential polygons ==
A tangential polygon is a polygon in which the sides are all tangent to a common circle. Since a circle can be defined by any three non-colinear points, all triangles are necessarily tangential. Indeed, every tangential polygon may be triangulated by drawing edges from the circle's center to the polygon's vertices, forming a collection of triangles that all have height equal to the circle's radius; it follows from this decomposition that the total area of a tangential polygon equals half the perimeter times the radius. Thus, a tangential polygon is equable if and only if its inradius is exactly two.

== Integer dimensions ==
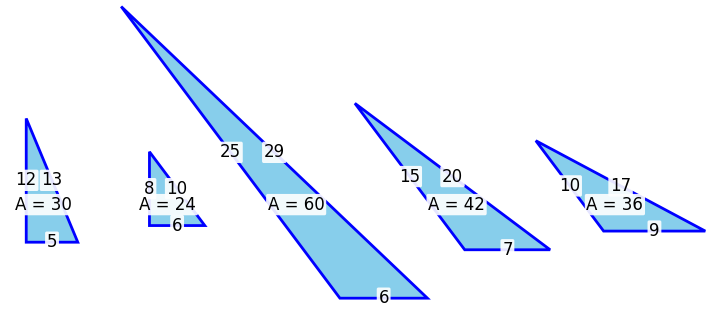
The only 5 equable integer triangles, the first 2 being the only 2 equable integer right triangles.

Combining restrictions that a shape be equable and that its dimensions be integers is significantly more restrictive than either restriction on its own. For instance, there are infinitely many Pythagorean triples describing integer-sided right triangles, and there are infinitely many equable right triangles with non-integer sides; however, there are only two equable integer right triangles, with side lengths (5,12,13) and (6,8,10).

More generally, the problem of finding all equable triangles with integer sides (that is, equable Heronian triangles) was considered by B. Yates in 1858. As W. A. Whitworth and D. Biddle proved in 1904, there are exactly three solutions, beyond the right triangles already listed, with sides (6,25,29), (7,15,20), and (9,10,17).

The only equable rectangles with integer sides are the 4 × 4 square and the 3 × 6 rectangle. An integer rectangle is a special type of polyomino, and more generally there exist polyominoes with equal area and perimeter for any even integer area greater than or equal to 16. For smaller areas, the perimeter of a polyomino must exceed its area.

== Equable solids ==
In three dimensions, a shape is equable when its surface area is numerically equal to its volume. An example is a cube with side length six. As with equable shapes in two dimensions, an equable solid may be found by scaling any solid by an appropriate factor.
