= Eugène Charles Catalan =

Franco-Belgian mathematician (1814–1894)

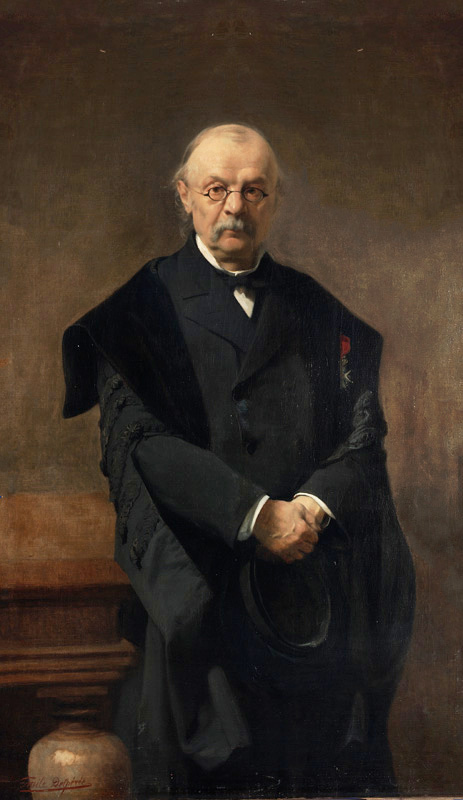
- Born: 30 May 1814; Brugge, [[United Kingdom of the Netherlands]]
- Died: 14 February 1894 (aged 79); Liège, Belgium
- Education: École Polytechnique
- Known for: Catalan numbers Catalan solids Catalan surface Catalan's conjecture Catalan's constant Catalan's identity Catalan's minimal surface
- Scientific career
- Fields: Mathematics
- Workplaces: École Polytechnique
- Thesis: Attraction d'un ellipsoïde homogène sur un point extérieur ou sur un point intérieur. (1841)
- Doctoral advisor: Joseph Liouville
- Doctoral students: François Deruyts
- Other notable students: Ernesto Cesàro; Charles Hermite; Constantin Le Paige

Eugène Charles Catalan (French: [øʒɛn ʃaʁl katalɑ̃]; 30 May 1814 – 14 February 1894) was a French and Belgian mathematician who worked on continued fractions, descriptive geometry, number theory and combinatorics. His notable contributions included discovering a periodic minimal surface in the space $\mathbb{R}^3$; stating the famous Catalan's conjecture, which was eventually proved in 2002; and introducing the Catalan numbers to solve a combinatorial problem.

== Life ==
Catalan was born in Brugge (now in Belgium, then under Dutch rule even though the Kingdom of the Netherlands had not yet been formally instituted), the only child of a French jeweller by the name of Joseph Catalan, in 1814. In 1825, he traveled to Paris and learned mathematics at École Polytechnique, where he met Joseph Liouville (1833). In December 1834 he was expelled along with most of the students in his year as part of a crackdown by the July Monarchy against republican tendencies among the students. He resumed his studies in January 1835, graduated that summer, and went on to teach at Châlons-sur-Marne. Catalan came back to the École Polytechnique, and, with the help of Liouville, obtained his degree in mathematics in 1841. He went on to Charlemagne College to teach descriptive geometry. Though he was politically active and strongly left-wing, leading him to participate in the 1848 Revolution, he had an animated career and also sat in the France's Chamber of Deputies. Later, in 1849, Catalan was visited at his home by the French Police, searching for illicit teaching material; however, none was found.

The University of Liège appointed him chair of analysis in 1865. In 1879, still in Belgium, he became journal editor where he published as a foot note Paul-Jean Busschop's theory after refusing it in 1873, letting Busschop know that it was too empirical. In 1883, he worked for the Belgian Academy of Science in the field of number theory. He died in Liège, Belgium, where he had received a chair.

== Work ==
He worked on continued fractions, descriptive geometry, number theory and combinatorics. He gave his name to a unique surface (periodic minimal surface in the space $\mathbb{R}^3$) that he discovered in 1855. Before that, he had stated the famous Catalan's conjecture, which was published in 1844 and was eventually proved in 2002 by Preda Mihăilescu. He introduced the Catalan numbers to solve a combinatorial problem (although these were actually discovered a century earlier by the astronomer Minggatu).

== Selected publications ==
- Théorèmes et Problèmes Géométrie élémentaire, Brussels, 2nd edition 1852, 6th edition 1879
- Éléments de géométrie, 1843, 2nd printing 1847
- Traité élémentaire de géométrie descriptive, 2 volumes 1850, 1852, 3rd edition 1867/1868, 5th edition 1881
- Nouveau manuel des aspirants au baccalauréat ès sciences, 1852 (12 editions published)
- Solutions des problèmes de mathématiques et de physique donnés à la Sorbonne dans les compositions du baccalauréat ès sciences, 1855/56
- Manuel des candidats à l'École Polytechnique, 2 volumes, 1857–58
- Notions d'astronomie, 1860 (6 editions published)
- Traité élémentaire des séries, 1860
- Histoire d'un concours, 1865, 2nd edition 1867
- Cours d'analyse de l'université de Liège, 1870, 2nd edition 1880
- Intégrales eulériennes ou elliptiques, 1892

== See also ==
- Catalan pseudoprime
- Catalan's triangle
- Catalan–Dickson conjecture
- Catalan–Mersenne number conjecture
- Catalan beta function
- Fermat–Catalan conjecture
- Fuss–Catalan number
- Catalan's constant
