= Catalan's triangle =

In combinatorial mathematics, Catalan's triangle is a number triangle whose entries $C(n,k)$ give the number of strings consisting of n X's and k Y's such that no initial segment of the string has more Y's than X's. It is a generalization of the Catalan numbers, and is named after Eugène Charles Catalan. Bailey shows that $C(n,k)$ satisfy the following properties:

1. $C(n,0)=1 \text{ for } n\geq 0$.
2. $C(n,1)=n \text{ for } n\geq 1$.
3. $C(n+1,k)=C(n+1,k-1)+C(n,k) \text{ for } 1<k<n+1$
4. $C(n+1,n+1)=C(n+1,n) \text{ for } n\geq 1$.

Formula 3 shows that the entry in the triangle is obtained recursively by adding numbers to the left and above in the triangle. The earliest appearance of the Catalan triangle along with the recursion formula is in page 214 of the treatise on Calculus published in 1800 by Louis François Antoine Arbogast.

Shapiro introduces another triangle which he calls the Catalan triangle that is distinct from the triangle being discussed here.

== General formula ==
The general formula for $C(n,k)$ is given by

$$C(n,k)= \binom{n+k}{k} - \binom{n+k}{k-1}$$

So

$$C(n,k) = \frac{n-k+1}{n+1}\binom{n+k}{k}$$

When $k=n$, the diagonal C(n, n) is the n-th Catalan number.

The row sum of the n-th row is the (n + 1)-th Catalan number, using the hockey-stick identity and an alternative expression for Catalan numbers.

== Table of values ==
Some values are given by

k n	0	1	2	3	4	5	6	7	8
0	1								
1	1	1							
2	1	2	2						
3	1	3	5	5					
4	1	4	9	14	14				
5	1	5	14	28	42	42			
6	1	6	20	48	90	132	132		
7	1	7	27	75	165	297	429	429	
8	1	8	35	110	275	572	1001	1430	1430

== Properties ==
- Formula 3 from the first section can be used to prove both

$$C(n,k) = \sum_{i=0}^k C(n-1,i) = \sum_{i=k}^n C(i,k-1)$$

That is, an entry is the partial sum of the above row and also the partial sum of the column to the left (except for the entry on the diagonal).

- If $k>n$, then at some stage there must be more Y's than X's, so $C(n,k)=0$.
- A combinatorial interpretation of the $(n,k-1)$-th value is the number of non-decreasing partitions with exactly n parts with maximum part k such that each part is less than or equal to its index. So, for example, $(4,2) = 9$ counts

$$1111, 1112, 1113, 1122, 1123, 1133, 1222, 1223, 1233$$

== Generalization ==
Catalan's trapezoids are a countable set of number trapezoids which generalize Catalan’s triangle. Catalan's trapezoid of order m = 1, 2, 3, ... is a number trapezoid whose entries $C_{m}(n,k)$ give the number of strings consisting of n X-s and k Y-s such that in every initial segment of the string the number of Y-s does not exceed the number of X-s by m or more. By definition, Catalan's trapezoid of order m = 1 is Catalan's triangle, i.e., $C_{1}(n,k)=C(n,k)$.

Some values of Catalan's trapezoid of order m = 2 are given by

k n	0	1	2	3	4	5	6	7	8
0	1	1							
1	1	2	2						
2	1	3	5	5					
3	1	4	9	14	14				
4	1	5	14	28	42	42			
5	1	6	20	48	90	132	132		
6	1	7	27	75	165	297	429	429	
7	1	8	35	110	275	572	1001	1430	1430

Some values of Catalan's trapezoid of order m = 3 are given by

k n	0	1	2	3	4	5	6	7	8	9
0	1	1	1							
1	1	2	3	3						
2	1	3	6	9	9					
3	1	4	10	19	28	28				
4	1	5	15	34	62	90	90			
5	1	6	21	55	117	207	297	297		
6	1	7	28	83	200	407	704	1001	1001	
7	1	8	36	119	319	726	1430	2431	3432	3432

Again, each element is the sum of the one above and the one to the left.

A general formula for $C_{m}(n,k)$ is given by

$$C_{m}(n,k)=\begin{cases}
\left(\begin{array}{c}
n+k\\
k
\end{array}\right) & \,\,\,0\leq k<m\\
\\
\left(\begin{array}{c}
n+k\\
k
\end{array}\right)-\left(\begin{array}{c}
n+k\\
k-m
\end{array}\right) & \,\,\, m\leq k\leq n+m-1\\
\\
0 & \,\,\, k>n+m-1
\end{cases}$$

( n = 0, 1, 2, ..., k = 0, 1, 2, ..., m = 1, 2, 3, ...).

== Proofs of the general formula ==
=== Proof 1 ===
This proof involves an extension of the second proof for the Catalan number to different diagonals. The following shows how every path from the bottom left $(0,0)$ to the top right $(k, n)$ of the diagram that crosses the constraint $n-k+m-1 = 0$ can also be reflected to the end point $(n + m, k - m)$.

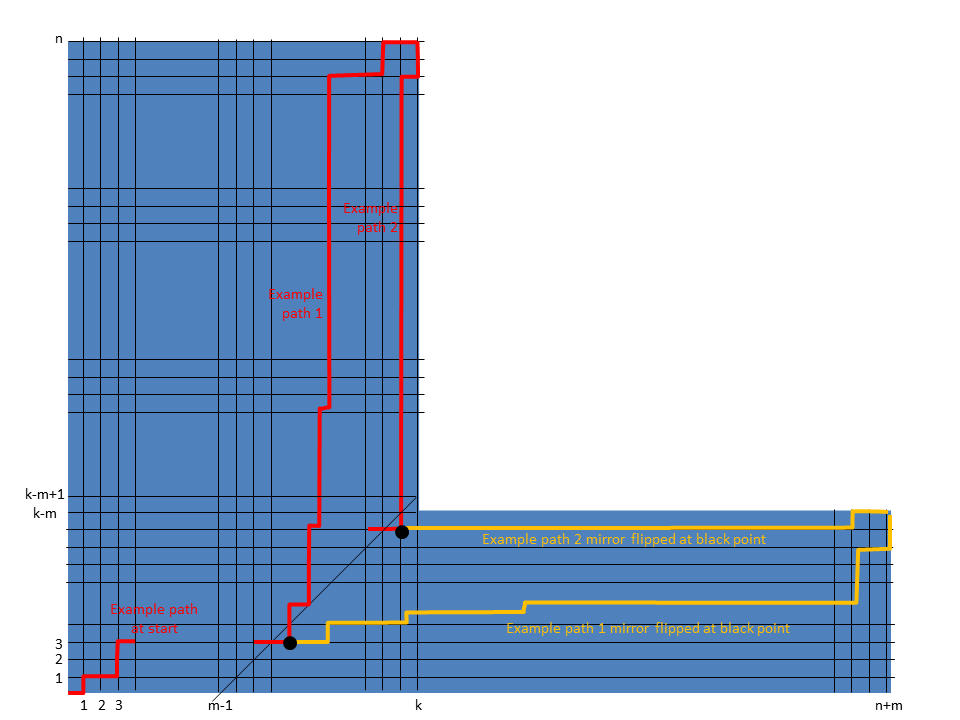

We consider three cases to determine the number of paths from $(0,0)$ to $(k, n)$ that do not cross the constraint:

(1) when $m > k$ the constraint cannot be crossed, so all paths from $(0,0)$ to $(k, n)$ are valid, i.e. $C_{m}(n,k)=\left(\begin{array}{c} n+k\\ k \end{array}\right)$.

(2) when $k - m + 1 > n$ it is impossible to form a path that does not cross the constraint, i.e. $C_{m}(n,k)= 0$.

(3) when $m\leq k\leq n+m-1$, then $C_{m}(n,k)$ is the number of 'red' paths $\left(\begin{array}{c} n+k\\ k \end{array}\right)$ minus the number of 'yellow' paths that cross the constraint, i.e. $\left(\begin{array}{c} (n+m)+(k-m)\\ k-m \end{array}\right) = \left(\begin{array}{c} n+k\\ k-m \end{array}\right)$.

Therefore the number of paths from $(0,0)$ to $(k, n)$ that do not cross the constraint $n - k + m - 1 = 0$ is as indicated in the formula in the previous section "Generalization".

=== Proof 2 ===
Firstly, we confirm the validity of the recurrence relation $C_{m}(n,k)=C_{m}(n-1,k)+C_{m}(n,k-1)$ by breaking down $C_{m}(n,k)$ into two parts, the first for XY combinations ending in X and the second for those ending in Y. The first group therefore has $C_{m}(n-1,k)$ valid combinations and the second has $C_{m}(n,k-1)$. Proof 2 is completed by verifying the solution satisfies the recurrence relation and obeys initial conditions for $C_{m}(n,0)$ and $C_{m}(0,k)$.
