= Wike's law of low odd primes =

Wike's law of low odd primes is a methodological principle to help design experiments in psychology. It is: "If the number of experimental treatments is a low odd prime number, then the experimental design is unbalanced and partially confounded" (Wike, 1973, pp. 192–193).

This law was stated by Edwin Wike in a humorous article in which he also admits that the association of his name with the law is an example of Stigler's law of eponymy.

The lowest odd prime number is three. Wike illustrates how this yields an unbalanced design with an invented study in which researchers investigated the effects of water beds on sexual satisfaction. The fictitious researchers randomly assigned couples to three groups: those having sex on a conventional bed, those having sex on a water bed, and those having sex on a water bed having also taken a sea sickness pill. Wike pointed out that any differences in sexual satisfaction among the three groups could be due to the water bed or to the sea sickness pill. It requires a fourth group, couples taking the pill and using a conventional bed, to balance the design and to allow the researchers to attribute any differences in sexual satisfaction among the groups to the sort of bed, to the pill, or to their interaction.
