= Journal de Mathématiques Pures et Appliquées =

- Discipline: Mathematics
- Language: English
- Edited by: Pierre-Louis Lions

Publication details
- History: 1836–present
- Publisher: Elsevier
- Frequency: Monthly
- Impact factor: 2.464 (2021)

Standard abbreviations
- ISO 4: J. Math. Pures Appl.

Indexing
- ISSN: 0021-7824 (print); 1776-3371 (web)
- OCLC no.: 1782372

Links
- Journal homepage; Online access (1997 - present)

The Journal de Mathématiques Pures et Appliquées (ISSN 0021-7824) is a French monthly scientific journal of mathematics, founded in 1836 by Joseph Liouville (editor: 1836–1874). The journal was originally published by Charles Louis Étienne Bachelier. After Bachelier's death in 1853, publishing passed to his son-in-law, Louis Alexandre Joseph Mallet, and the journal was marked Mallet-Bachelier. The publisher was sold to Gauthier-Villars (fr) in 1863, where it remained for many decades. The journal is currently published by Elsevier. According to the 2018 Journal Citation Reports, its impact factor is 2.464. Articles are written in English or French.

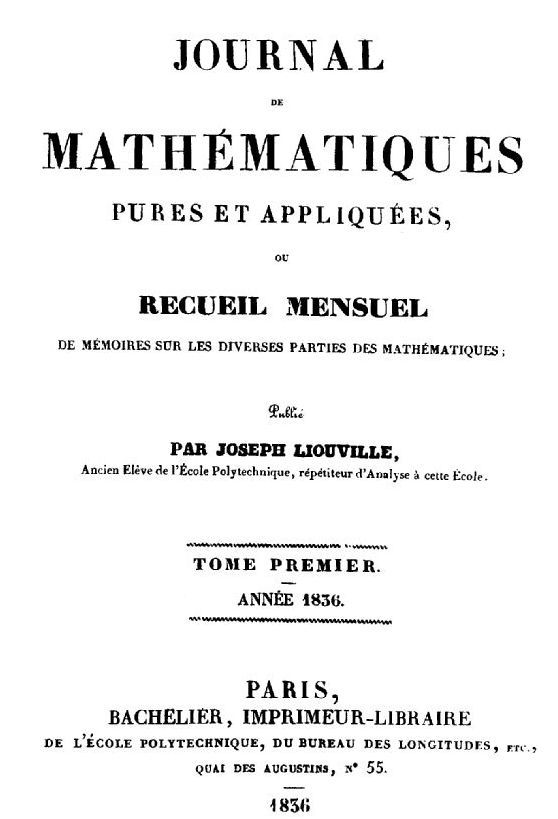
Title page of the first volume in 1836.
