= Stephen Stigler =

American statistician

Stephen M. Stigler
- Born: August 10, 1941 (age 85); Minneapolis, Minnesota, U.S.
- Education: Carleton College (BA); University of California, Berkeley (PhD)
- Known for: Stigler's law of eponymy
- Scientific career
- Fields: Robust statistics
- Workplaces: University of Wisconsin–Madison; University of Chicago; Institute of Mathematical Statistics
- Thesis: Linear Functions of Order Statistics (1967)
- Doctoral advisor: Lucien Le Cam
- Doctoral students: Lee-Jen Wei; Alan Agresti
- Website: www.stat.uchicago.edu/~stigler/

Stephen Mack Stigler (born August 10, 1941) is the Ernest DeWitt Burton Distinguished Service Professor at the Department of Statistics of the University of Chicago. He has authored several books on the history of statistics; he is the son of the economist George Stigler.

Stigler is also known for Stigler's law of eponymy which states that no scientific discovery is named after its original discoverer – whose first formulation he credits to sociologist Robert K. Merton.

== Biography ==
Stigler was born in Minneapolis. He received his Ph.D. in 1967 from the University of California, Berkeley. His dissertation was on linear functions of order statistics, and his advisor was Lucien Le Cam. His research has focused on statistical theory of robust estimators and the history of statistics.

Stigler taught at University of Wisconsin–Madison until 1979 when he joined the University of Chicago. In 2006, he was elected to membership of the American Philosophical Society, and is a past president (1994) of the Institute of Mathematical Statistics.

He received the Quantrell Award.

His father was the economist George Stigler, who was a close friend of Milton Friedman.

== Bibliography ==
=== Books ===
- The History of Statistics: The Measurement of Uncertainty before 1900. Cambridge, MA: Harvard University Press. 1986. ISBN 978-0-6744-0341-3.
- Statistics on the Table: The History of Statistical Concepts and Methods. Cambridge, MA: Harvard University Press. 1999. ISBN 978-0-6740-0979-0.
- The Seven Pillars of Statistical Wisdom. Cambridge, MA: Harvard University Press. 2016. ISBN 978-0-6740-8891-7.
- Casanova's Lottery: The History of a Revolutionary Game of Chance. Chicago: University of Chicago Press. 2022. ISBN 9780226820781.

As editor

- Stigler, S. M. (1980). American Contributions to Mathematical Statistics in the Nineteenth Century (2 Vols.). New York: Arno Press. ISBN 978-0-4051-2590-4.
- Stigler, S. M.; Wong, W. H.; Xu, D. (2002). R. R. Bahadur's Lectures on the Theory of Estimation (Lecture Notes-Regional Monograph Series, Vol. 39). Beachwood, OH: Institute for Mathematical Statistics. ISBN 978-0-9406-0053-9.

=== Selected articles ===
- ——— Gergonne, J. D. (1974) [1815]. Ralph St. John and S. M. Stigler (ed.). "The application of the method of least squares to the interpolation of sequences (translated by Ralph St. John and S. M. Stigler)". Historia Mathematica. 1 (4) (translated by Ralph St. John and S. M. Stigler from the 1815 French ed.): 439–47. doi:10.1016/0315-0860(74)90034-2.
- ——— Stigler, Stephen M. (1974). "Gergonne's 1815 paper on the design and analysis of polynomial regression experiments". Historia Mathematica. 1 (4): 431–39. doi:10.1016/0315-0860(74)90033-0.
- ——— Stigler, Stephen M. (March 1978). "Mathematical statistics in the early States". Annals of Statistics. 6 (2): 239–65. doi:10.1214/aos/1176344123. JSTOR 2958876. MR 0483118.
  - Stigler, Stephen M. (1980). "Mathematical Statistics in the Early States". In Stephen M. Stigler (ed.). American Contributions to Mathematical Statistics in the Nineteenth Century, Volumes I & II. Vol. I. New York: Arno Press.
  - Stigler, Stephen M. (1989). "Mathematical Statistics in the Early States". In Peter Duren (ed.). A Century of Mathematics in America. Vol. III. Providence, RI: American Mathematical Society. pp. 537–64.
- ——— Stigler, Stephen M. (1978). "Francis Ysidro Edgeworth, statistician". Journal of the Royal Statistical Society, Series A. 141 (3): 287–322. doi:10.2307/2344804. JSTOR 2344804.
- ——— Stigler, S. M. (1980). Stigler's law of eponymy. Transactions of the New York Academy of Sciences, 39: 147–58 (Merton Festschrift Volume, F. Gieryn (ed))
- ——— Stigler, Stephen M. (November 1983). "Who discovered Bayes's theorem?". The American Statistician. 37 (4): 290–96. doi:10.2307/2682766. JSTOR 2682766. MR 1712969. Republished in Statistics on the table ().
- ——— Stephen M. Stigler (November 1992). "A Historical View of Statistical Concepts in Psychology and Educational Research". American Journal of Education. 101 (1): 60–70. doi:10.1086/444032. S2CID 143685203.

== See also ==
- Chicago school of economics
- George Stigler
- List of examples of Stigler's law
- Milton Friedman
- Stigler's law of eponymy
