= Stigler's law of eponymy =

Observation that no scientific discovery is named after its discoverer

Stigler's law of eponymy, proposed by University of Chicago statistics professor Stephen Stigler in 1980, states that no scientific discovery is named after its original discoverer. Examples include Hubble's law, which was derived by Georges Lemaître two years before Edwin Hubble; the Pythagorean theorem, which was known to Babylonian and Indian mathematicians before Pythagoras; and Halley's Comet, which was observed by astronomers since at least 240 BC (although its official designation is due to the first ever mathematical prediction of such astronomical phenomenon in the sky, not to its discovery). Eponymic inventions not named after their first inventor are generally also seen as examples of this law in action.

Stigler attributed the discovery of Stigler's law to sociologist Robert K. Merton, making "Stigler's law" an example of Stigler's law.

In his paper, Stigler wrote:

I have chosen as a title for this paper, and for the thesis I wish to present and discuss, "Stigler's law of eponymy". At first glance this may appear to be a flagrant violation of the "Institutional Norm of Humility", and since statisticians are even more aware of the importance of norms than are members of other disciplines, I hasten to add a humble disclaimer. If there is an idea in this paper that is not at least implicit in Merton's The Sociology of Science, it is either a happy accident or a likely error. Rather I have, in the Mertonian tradition of the self-confirming hypothesis, attempted to frame the self-proving theorem. For "Stigler's Law of Eponymy" in its simplest form is this: "No scientific discovery is named after its original discoverer."

The same observation had previously also been made by many others.

== Derivation ==
Historical acclaim for discoveries is often assigned to persons of note who bring attention to an idea that is not yet widely known, whether or not that person was its original inventor – theories may be named long after their discovery. In the case of eponymy, the idea becomes named after that person, even if that person is acknowledged by historians of science not to be the one who discovered it. Often, several people will arrive at a new idea around the same time, as in the case of calculus. It can be dependent on the publicity of the new work and the fame of its publisher as to whether the scientist's name becomes historically associated.

== Similar concepts ==
There is a similar quote attributed to Mark Twain:

It takes a thousand men to invent a telegraph, or a steam engine, or a phonograph, or a photograph, or a telephone or any other important thing—and the last man gets the credit and we forget the others. He added his little mite—that is all he did. These object lessons should teach us that ninety-nine parts of all things that proceed from the intellect are plagiarisms, pure and simple; and the lesson ought to make us modest. But nothing can do that.

Stephen Stigler's father, the economist George Stigler, also examined the process of discovery in economics. He said: "If an earlier, valid statement of a theory falls on deaf ears, and a later restatement is accepted by the science, this is surely proof that the science accepts ideas only when they fit into the then-current state of the science." He gave several examples in which the original discoverer was not recognized as such. Similar arguments were made in regards to accepted ideas relative to the state of science by Thomas Kuhn in The Structure of Scientific Revolutions.

The Matthew effect was coined by Robert K. Merton to describe how eminent scientists get more credit than a comparatively unknown researcher, even if their work is similar, so that credit will usually be given to researchers who are already famous. Merton notes:

This pattern of recognition, skewed in favor of the established scientist, appears principally

(i) in cases of collaboration and
(ii) in cases of independent multiple discoveries made by scientists of distinctly different rank.

The effect applies specifically to women through the Matilda effect.

Boyer's law was named by Hubert Kennedy in 1972. It says "Mathematical formulas and theorems are usually not named after their original discoverers" and was named after Carl Boyer, whose 1968 book A History of Mathematics contains many examples of this law. Kennedy observed that "it is perhaps interesting to note that this is probably a rare instance of a law whose statement confirms its own validity".

"Everything of importance has been said before by somebody who did not discover it" is an adage attributed to Alfred North Whitehead.

Russian mathematician Vladimir Arnold wrote in 1998:

Similarly to the fact that America does not carry Columbus's name, mathematical results are almost never called by the names of their discoverers. ... Prof. M. Berry once formulated the following two principles:

- The Arnold principle. If a notion bears a personal name, then this name is not the name of the discoverer.
- The Berry principle. The Arnold Principle is applicable to itself.

According to John David Jackson (physicist), the historian of science Ernst Peter Fischer defined the "zeroth theorem of the history of science", in a 2006 article in Die Welt, as "that a discovery (rule, regularity, insight), named after someone did not originate with that person." Jackson's article, which also cites Arnol'd and Berry, provides five examples from the history of physics and Earth science.

== See also ==
- List of misnamed theorems
- List of persons considered father or mother of a scientific field
- Obliteration by incorporation
- Scientific priority – Credit for first discovery
- Standing on the shoulders of giants – Metaphor acknowledging past thinkers
- Theories and sociology of the history of science – Diachronically-comparative sociological analysis of scienticity
