= William Allen Whitworth =

William Allen Whitworth (1 February 1840 – 12 March 1905) was an English mathematician and a priest in the Church of England.

== Education and mathematical career ==
Whitworth was born in Runcorn; his father, William Whitworth, was a school headmaster, and he was the oldest of six siblings. He was schooled at the Sandicroft School in Northwich and then at St John's College, Cambridge, earning a B.A. in 1862 as 16th Wrangler. He taught mathematics at the Portarlington School and the Rossall School, and was a professor of mathematics at Queen's College in Liverpool from 1862 to 1864. He returned to Cambridge to earn a master's degree in 1865, and was a fellow there from 1867 to 1882.

== Mathematical contributions ==
As an undergraduate, Whitworth became the founding editor in chief of the Messenger of Mathematics, and he continued as its editor until 1880. He published works about the logarithmic spiral and about trilinear coordinates, but his most famous mathematical publication is the book Choice and Chance: An Elementary Treatise on Permutations, Combinations, and Probability (first published in 1867 and extended over several later editions). The first edition of the book treated the subject primarily from the point of view of arithmetic calculations, but had an appendix on algebra, and was based on lectures he had given at Queen's College. Later editions added material on enumerative combinatorics (the numbers of ways of arranging items into groups with various constraints), derangements, frequentist probability, life expectancy, and the fairness of bets, among other topics.

Among the other contributions in this book, Whitworth was the first to use ordered Bell numbers to count the number of weak orderings of a set, in the 1886 edition. These numbers had been studied earlier by Arthur Cayley, but for a different problem. He was the first to publish Bertrand's ballot theorem, in 1878; the theorem is misnamed after Joseph Louis François Bertrand, who rediscovered the same result in 1887. He is the inventor of the E[X] notation for the expected value of a random variable X, still commonly in use, and he coined the name "subfactorial" for the number of derangements of n items.

Another of Whitworth's contributions, in geometry, concerns equable shapes, shapes whose area has the same numerical value (with a different set of units) as their perimeter. As Whitworth showed with D. Biddle in 1904, there are exactly five equable triangles with integer sides: the two right triangles with side lengths (5,12,13) and (6,8,10), and the three triangles with side lengths (6,25,29), (7,15,20), and (9,10,17).

== Religious career ==
Whitworth was ordained as a deacon in 1865, and became a priest in 1866. He served as the curate of St Anne's Church in Birkenhead in 1865, of the Church of St Luke, Liverpool from 1866 to 1870 and of Christ Church in Liverpool from 1870 to 1875. He was then a vicar in London at St John the Evangelist's in Hammersmith. From 1886 to 1905 he was vicar of All Saints, Margaret Street.

He was the Hulsean Lecturer in 1903.
