= Benford's law =

Observation that in many real-life datasets, the leading digit is likely to be small

The distribution of first digits, according to Benford's law. Each bar represents a digit, and the height of the bar is the percentage of numbers that start with that digit.

Frequency of first significant digit of physical constants plotted against Benford's law

Benford's law, also known as the Newcomb–Benford law, the law of anomalous numbers, or the first-digit law, is an observation that in many real-life sets of numerical data, the leading digit is likely to be small. In sets that obey the law, the number 1 appears as the leading significant digit about 30% of the time, while 9 appears as the leading significant digit less than 5% of the time. Uniformly distributed digits would each occur about 11.1% of the time. Benford's law also makes predictions about the distribution of second digits, third digits, digit combinations, and so on.

Benford's law may be derived by assuming the dataset values are uniformly distributed on a logarithmic scale. The graph to the right shows Benford's law for base 10. Although a decimal base is most common, the result generalizes to any integer base greater than or equal to 2. Further generalizations published in 1995 included analogous statements for both the nth leading digit and the joint distribution of the leading n digits, the latter of which leads to a corollary wherein the significant digits are shown to be a statistically dependent quantity.

It has been shown that this result applies to a wide variety of data sets, including electricity bills, street addresses, stock prices, house prices, population numbers, death rates, lengths of rivers, and physical and mathematical constants. Like other general principles about natural data—for example, the fact that many data sets are well approximated by a normal distribution—there are illustrative examples and explanations that cover many of the cases where Benford's law applies, though there are many other cases where Benford's law applies that resist simple explanations. Benford's law tends to be most accurate when values are distributed across multiple orders of magnitude, especially if the process generating the numbers is described by a power law (which is common in nature).

The law is named after physicist Frank Benford, who stated it in 1938 in an article titled "The Law of Anomalous Numbers", although it had been previously stated by Simon Newcomb in 1881.

== Definition ==
A logarithmic scale bar. Picking a random x position uniformly on this number line, roughly 30% of the time the first nonzero digit of the number will be 1.

A set of numbers is said to satisfy Benford's law if the leading digit d (d ∈ {1, ..., 9}) occurs with probability

$$P(d) = \log_{10}(d + 1) - \log_{10}(d) = \log_{10}\left(\frac{d + 1}{d}\right) = \log_{10}\left(1 + \frac{1}{d}\right).$$

The leading digits in such a set thus have the following distribution:

d	$P(d)$	Relative size of $P(d)$
1	30.1%	
2	17.6%	
3	12.5%	
4	9.7%	
5	7.9%	
6	6.7%	
7	5.8%	
8	5.1%	
9	4.6%	

The quantity $P(d)$ is proportional to the space between d and d + 1 on a logarithmic scale. Therefore, this is the distribution expected if the logarithms of the numbers (but not the numbers themselves) are uniformly and randomly distributed.

For example, a number x, constrained to lie between 1 and 10, starts with the digit 1 if 1 ≤ x < 2, and starts with the digit 9 if 9 ≤ x < 10. Therefore, x starts with the digit 1 if log 1 ≤ log x < log 2, or starts with 9 if log 9 ≤ log x < log 10. The interval [log 1, log 2] is much wider than the interval [log 9, log 10] (0.30 and 0.05 respectively); therefore if log x is uniformly and randomly distributed, it is much more likely to fall into the wider interval than the narrower interval, i.e. more likely to start with 1 than with 9; the probabilities are proportional to the interval widths, giving the equation above (as well as the generalization to other bases besides decimal).

Benford's law is sometimes stated in a stronger form, asserting that the fractional part of the logarithm of data is typically close to uniformly distributed between 0 and 1; from this, the main claim about the distribution of first digits can be derived.

=== In other bases ===
Graphs of P(d) for initial digit d in various bases. (Note: They should strictly be bars but are shown as lines for clarity.) The dotted line shows P(d) were the distribution uniform. (In the SVG image, hover over a graph to show the value for each point.)

An extension of Benford's law predicts the distribution of first digits in other bases besides decimal; in fact, any base b ≥ 2. The general form is

$$P(d) = \log_b(d + 1) - \log_b(d) = \log_b\left(1 + \frac{1}{d}\right).$$

For b = 2, 1 (the binary and unary) number systems, Benford's law is true but trivial: All binary and unary numbers (except for 0 or the empty set) start with the digit 1. (On the other hand, the generalization of Benford's law to second and later digits is not trivial, even for binary numbers.)

== Examples ==
Distribution of first digits (in %, red bars) in the population of the 237 countries of the world as of July 2010. Black dots indicate the distribution predicted by Benford's law.

Examining a list of the heights of the 58 tallest structures in the world by category shows that 1 is by far the most common leading digit, irrespective of the unit of measurement (see "scale invariance" below):

Leading digit	m		ft		Per Benford's law
Leading digit	Count	Share	Count	Share	Per Benford's law
1	23	39.7 %	15	25.9 %	30.1 %
2	12	20.7 %	8	13.8 %	17.6 %
3	6	10.3 %	5	8.6 %	12.5 %
4	5	8.6 %	7	12.1 %	9.7 %
5	2	3.4 %	9	15.5 %	7.9 %
6	5	8.6 %	4	6.9 %	6.7 %
7	1	1.7 %	3	5.2 %	5.8 %
8	4	6.9 %	6	10.3 %	5.1 %
9	0	0 %	1	1.7 %	4.6 %

Another example is the leading digit of 2^{n}. The sequence of the first 96 leading digits (1, 2, 4, 8, 1, 3, 6, 1, 2, 5, 1, 2, 4, 8, 1, 3, 6, 1, ... (sequence A008952 in the OEIS)) exhibits closer adherence to Benford's law than is expected for random sequences of the same length, because it is derived from a geometric sequence.

Leading digit	Occurrence		Per Benford's law
Leading digit	Count	Share	Per Benford's law
1	29	30.2 %	30.1 %
2	17	17.7 %	17.6 %
3	12	12.5 %	12.5 %
4	10	10.4 %	9.7 %
5	7	7.3 %	7.9 %
6	6	6.3 %	6.7 %
7	5	5.2 %	5.8 %
8	5	5.2 %	5.1 %
9	5	5.2 %	4.6 %

== History ==
The discovery of Benford's law goes back to 1881, when the Canadian-American astronomer Simon Newcomb noticed that in logarithm tables the earlier pages (that started with 1) were much more worn than the other pages. Newcomb's published result is the first known instance of this observation and includes a distribution on the second digit as well. Newcomb proposed a law that the probability of a single number N being the first digit of a number was equal to log(N + 1) − log(N).

The phenomenon was again noted in 1938 by the physicist Frank Benford, who tested it on data from 20 different domains and was credited for it. His data set included the surface areas of 335 rivers, the sizes of 3259 US populations, 104 physical constants, 1800 molecular weights, 5000 entries from a mathematical handbook, 308 numbers contained in an issue of Reader's Digest, the street addresses of the first 342 persons listed in American Men of Science and 418 death rates. The total number of observations used in the paper was 20,229. This discovery was later named after Benford (making it an example of Stigler's law).

In 1995, Ted Hill proved the result about mixed distributions mentioned below.

== Explanations ==
Benford's law tends to apply most accurately to data that span several orders of magnitude. As a rule of thumb, the more orders of magnitude that the data evenly covers, the more accurately Benford's law applies. For instance, one can expect that Benford's law would apply to a list of numbers representing the populations of United Kingdom settlements. But if a "settlement" is defined as a village with population between 300 and 999, then Benford's law will not apply.

Consider the probability distributions shown below, referenced to a log scale. In each case, the total area in red is the relative probability that the first digit is 1, and the total area in blue is the relative probability that the first digit is 8. For the first distribution, the size of the areas of red and blue are approximately proportional to the widths of each red and blue bar. Therefore, the numbers drawn from this distribution will approximately follow Benford's law. On the other hand, for the second distribution, the ratio of the areas of red and blue is very different from the ratio of the widths of each red and blue bar. Rather, the relative areas of red and blue are determined more by the heights of the bars than the widths. Accordingly, the first digits in this distribution do not satisfy Benford's law at all.

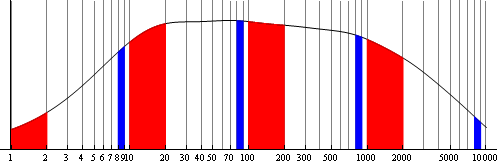
A broad probability distribution of the log of a variable, shown on a log scale. Benford's law can be seen in the larger area covered by red (first digit one) compared to blue (first digit 8) shading.

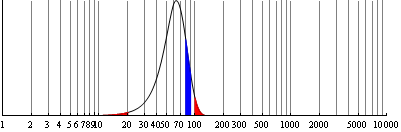
A narrow probability distribution of the log of a variable, shown on a log scale. Benford's law is not followed, because the narrow distribution does not meet the criteria for Benford's law.

Thus, real-world distributions that span several orders of magnitude rather uniformly (e.g., stock-market prices and populations of villages, towns, and cities) are likely to satisfy Benford's law very accurately. On the other hand, a distribution mostly or entirely within one order of magnitude (e.g., IQ scores or heights of human adults) is unlikely to satisfy Benford's law very accurately, if at all. However, the difference between applicable and inapplicable regimes is not a sharp cut-off: as the distribution gets narrower, the deviations from Benford's law increase gradually.

(This discussion is not a full explanation of Benford's law, because it has not explained why data sets are so often encountered that, when plotted as a probability distribution of the logarithm of the variable, are relatively uniform over several orders of magnitude. (Note: Berger and Hill describe this argument but say it "still leaves open the question of why it is reasonable to assume that the logarithm of the spread, as opposed to the spread itself—or, say, the log log spread—should be large" and that "assuming large spread on a logarithmic scale is equivalent to assuming an approximate conformance with [Benford's law]" (italics added), something which they say lacks a "simple explanation".))

One possible explanation comes from the structure of positional notation used to write numbers.

=== Krieger–Kafri entropy explanation ===
In 1970 Wolfgang Krieger proved what is now called the Krieger generator theorem. The Krieger generator theorem might be viewed as a justification for the assumption in the Kafri ball-and-box model that, in a given base $B$ with a fixed number of digits 0, 1, ..., n, ..., $B - 1$, digit n is equivalent to a Kafri box containing n non-interacting balls. Other scientists and statisticians have suggested entropy-related explanations for Benford's law.

=== Multiplicative fluctuations ===
Many real-world examples of Benford's law arise from multiplicative fluctuations. For example, if a stock price starts at $100, and then each day it gets multiplied by a randomly chosen factor between 0.99 and 1.01, then over an extended period the probability distribution of its price satisfies Benford's law with higher and higher accuracy.

The reason is that the logarithm of the stock price is undergoing a random walk, so over time its probability distribution will get more and more broad and smooth (see above). (More technically, the central limit theorem says that multiplying more and more random variables will create a log-normal distribution with larger and larger variance, so eventually it covers many orders of magnitude almost uniformly.) To be sure of approximate agreement with Benford's law, the distribution has to be approximately invariant when scaled up by any factor up to 10; a log-normally distributed data set with wide dispersion would have this approximate property.

Unlike multiplicative fluctuations, additive fluctuations do not lead to Benford's law: They lead instead to normal probability distributions (again by the central limit theorem), which do not satisfy Benford's law. By contrast, that hypothetical stock price described above can be written as the product of many random variables (i.e. the price change factor for each day), so is likely to follow Benford's law quite well.

=== Multiple probability distributions ===
Anton Formann provided an alternative explanation by directing attention to the interrelation between the distribution of the significant digits and the distribution of the observed variable. He showed in a simulation study that long-right-tailed distributions of a random variable are compatible with the Newcomb–Benford law, and that for distributions of the ratio of two random variables the fit generally improves. For numbers drawn from certain distributions (IQ scores, human heights) the Benford's law fails to hold because these variates obey a normal distribution, which is known not to satisfy Benford's law, since normal distributions can't span several orders of magnitude and the Significand of their logarithms will not be (even approximately) uniformly distributed. However, if one "mixes" numbers from those distributions, for example, by taking numbers from newspaper articles, Benford's law reappears. This can also be proven mathematically: if one repeatedly "randomly" chooses a probability distribution (from an uncorrelated set) and then randomly chooses a number according to that distribution, the resulting list of numbers will obey Benford's law. A similar probabilistic explanation for the appearance of Benford's law in everyday-life numbers has been advanced by showing that it arises naturally when one considers mixtures of uniform distributions.

=== Invariance ===
In a list of lengths, the distribution of first digits of numbers in the list may be generally similar regardless of whether all the lengths are expressed in metres, yards, feet, inches, etc. The same applies to monetary units.

This is not always the case. For example, the height of adult humans almost always starts with a 1 or 2 when measured in metres and almost always starts with 4, 5, 6, or 7 when measured in feet. But in a list of lengths spread evenly over many orders of magnitude—for example, a list of 1000 lengths mentioned in scientific papers that includes the measurements of molecules, bacteria, plants, and galaxies—it is reasonable to expect the distribution of first digits to be the same no matter whether the lengths are written in metres or in feet.

When the distribution of the first digits of a data set is scale-invariant (independent of the units that the data are expressed in), it is always given by Benford's law.

For example, the first (non-zero) digit on the aforementioned list of lengths should have the same distribution whether the unit of measurement is feet or yards. But there are three feet in a yard, so the probability that the first digit of a length in yards is 1 must be the same as the probability that the first digit of a length in feet is 3, 4, or 5; similarly, the probability that the first digit of a length in yards is 2 must be the same as the probability that the first digit of a length in feet is 6, 7, or 8. Applying this to all possible measurement scales gives the logarithmic distribution of Benford's law.

Benford's law for first digits is base invariant for number systems. There are conditions and proofs of sum invariance, inverse invariance, and addition and subtraction invariance.

== Applications ==
=== Election data ===
Walter Mebane, a political scientist and statistician at the University of Michigan, was the first to apply the second-digit Benford's law-test (2BL-test) in election forensics. Such analysis is considered a simple, though not foolproof, method of identifying irregularities in election results. Scientific consensus to support the applicability of Benford's law to elections has not been reached in the literature. A 2011 study by the political scientists Joseph Deckert, Mikhail Myagkov, and Peter C. Ordeshook argued that Benford's law is problematic and misleading as a statistical indicator of election fraud. Their method was criticized by Mebane in a response, though he agreed that there are many caveats to the application of Benford's law to election data.

Benford's law has been used as evidence of fraud in the 2009 Iranian elections. An analysis by Mebane found that the second digits in vote counts for President Mahmoud Ahmadinejad, the winner of the election, tended to differ significantly from the expectations of Benford's law, and that the ballot boxes with very few invalid ballots had a greater influence on the results, suggesting widespread ballot stuffing. Another study used bootstrap simulations to find that the candidate Mehdi Karroubi received almost twice as many vote counts beginning with the digit 7 as would be expected according to Benford's law, while an analysis from Columbia University concluded that the probability that a fair election would produce both too few non-adjacent digits and the suspicious deviations in last-digit frequencies as found in the 2009 Iranian presidential election is less than 0.5 percent. Benford's law has also been applied for forensic auditing and fraud detection on data from the 2003 California gubernatorial election, the 2000 and 2004 United States presidential elections, and the 2009 German federal election. The Benford's Law Test was found to be "worth taking seriously as a statistical test for fraud," although "the test is not sensitive to distortions we know significantly affected many votes. In particular, the test does not indicate problems for Florida in 2000."

Benford's law has also been misapplied to claim election fraud. When applying the law to Joe Biden's election returns for Chicago, Milwaukee, and other localities in the 2020 United States presidential election, the distribution of the first digit did not follow Benford's law. The misapplication was a result of looking at data that was tightly bound in range, which violates the assumption inherent in Benford's law that the range of the data be large. The first digit test was applied to precinct-level data, but because precincts rarely receive more than a few thousand or fewer than several dozen votes, Benford's law cannot be expected to apply. According to Mebane, "It is widely understood that the first digits of precinct vote counts are not useful for trying to diagnose election frauds."

=== Price digit analysis ===
Researchers have used Benford's law to detect psychological pricing patterns, in a Europe-wide study in consumer product prices before and after euro was introduced in 2002. The idea was that, without psychological pricing, the first two or three digits of price of items should follow Benford's law. Consequently, if the distribution of digits deviates from Benford's law (such as having a lot of 9's), it means merchants may have used psychological pricing.

When the euro replaced local currencies in 2002, for a brief period of time, the price of goods in euro was simply converted from the price of goods in local currencies before the replacement. As it is essentially impossible to use psychological pricing simultaneously on both price-in-euro and price-in-local-currency, during the transition period, psychological pricing would be disrupted even if it used to be present. It can only be re-established once consumers have gotten used to prices in a single currency again, this time in euro.

As the researchers expected, the distribution of first price digit followed Benford's law, but the distribution of the second and third digits deviated significantly from Benford's law before the introduction, then deviated less during the introduction, then deviated more again after the introduction.

=== Scientific fraud detection ===
Regression coefficients from published scientific papers, presumed nonfabricated, were compared with coefficients fabricated by test subjects. The scientific coefficients showed good compliance with Benford's law for first, second, and higher digits. The first digits of the fabricated coefficients showed approximate Benford behavior, but the higher digits did not.

== Statistical tests ==
Although the chi-squared test has been used to test for compliance with Benford's law it has low statistical power when used with small samples.

The Kolmogorov–Smirnov test and the Kuiper test are more powerful when the sample size is small, particularly when Stephens's corrective factor is used. These tests may be unduly conservative when applied to discrete distributions. Values for the Benford test have been generated by Morrow. The critical values of the test statistics are shown below:

⍺ Test	0.10	0.05	0.01
Kuiper	1.191	1.321	1.579
Kolmogorov–Smirnov	1.012	1.148	1.420

These critical values provide the minimum test statistic values required to reject the hypothesis of compliance with Benford's law at the given significance levels.

Two alternative tests specific to this law have been published: First, the max (m) statistic is given by

$$m = \sqrt{N} \cdot \max_{k=1}^9 \left\{\left|\Pr\left(X \text{ has FSD} = k\right) - \log_{10}\left(1 + \frac{1}{k}\right)\right|\right\}.$$

The leading factor $\sqrt{N}$ does not appear in the original formula by Leemis; it was added by Morrow in a later paper.

Secondly, the distance (d) statistic is given by

$$d = \sqrt{N \cdot \sum_{l=1}^9 \left[\Pr\left(X \text{ has FSD} = l\right) - \log_{10}\left(1 + \frac{1}{l}\right)\right]^2},$$

where FSD is the first significant digit and N is the sample size. Morrow has determined the critical values for both these statistics, which are shown below:

⍺ Statistic	0.10	0.05	0.01
Leemis's m	0.851	0.967	1.212
Cho & Gaines's d	1.212	1.330	1.569

Morrow has also shown that for any random variable X (with a continuous PDF) divided by its standard deviation (σ), some value A can be found so that the probability of the distribution of the first significant digit of the random variable $|X/\sigma|^A$ will differ from Benford's law by less than ε > 0. The value of A depends on the value of ε and the distribution of the random variable.

A method of accounting fraud detection based on bootstrapping and regression has been proposed.

If the goal is to conclude agreement with the Benford's law rather than disagreement, then the goodness-of-fit tests mentioned above are inappropriate. In this case the specific tests for equivalence should be applied. An empirical distribution is called equivalent to the Benford's law if a distance (for example total variation distance or the usual Euclidean distance) between the probability mass functions is sufficiently small. This method of testing with application to Benford's law is described in Ostrovski.

== Range of applicability ==
=== Distributions known to obey Benford's law ===
Some well-known infinite integer sequences provably satisfy Benford's law exactly (in the asymptotic limit as more and more terms of the sequence are included). Among these are the Fibonacci numbers, the factorials, the powers of 2, and the powers of almost any other number. (Note: In general, the sequence k^{1}, k^{2}, k^{3}, etc., satisfies Benford's law exactly, under the condition that log_{10} k is an irrational number. This is a straightforward consequence of the equidistribution theorem.)

Likewise, some continuous processes satisfy Benford's law exactly (in the asymptotic limit as the process continues through time). One is an exponential growth or decay process: If a quantity is exponentially increasing or decreasing in time, then the percentage of time that it has each first digit satisfies Benford's law asymptotically (i.e. increasing accuracy as the process continues through time).

=== Distributions known to disobey Benford's law ===
The square roots and reciprocals of successive natural numbers do not obey this law. Prime numbers in a finite range follow a Generalized Benford's law, that approaches uniformity as the size of the range approaches infinity. Lists of local telephone numbers violate Benford's law. Benford's law is violated by the populations of all places with a population of at least 2500 individuals from five US states according to the 1960 and 1970 censuses, where only 19 % began with digit 1 but 20 % began with digit 2, because truncation at 2500 introduces statistical bias. The terminal digits in pathology reports violate Benford's law due to rounding.

Distributions that do not span several orders of magnitude will not follow Benford's law. Examples include height, weight, and IQ scores.

=== Criteria for distributions expected and not expected to obey Benford's law ===
A number of criteria, applicable particularly to accounting data, have been suggested where Benford's law can be expected to apply.

Distributions that can be expected to obey Benford's law

- When the mean is greater than the median and the skew is positive
- Numbers that result from mathematical combination of numbers: e.g. quantity × price
- Transaction level data: e.g. disbursements, sales

Distributions that would not be expected to obey Benford's law

- Where numbers are assigned sequentially: e.g. check numbers, invoice numbers
- Where numbers are influenced by human thought: e.g. prices set by psychological thresholds ($9.99)
- Accounts with a large number of firm-specific numbers: e.g. accounts set up to record $100 refunds
- Accounts with a built-in minimum or maximum
- Distributions that do not span an order of magnitude of numbers.

=== Benford's law compliance theorem ===
Mathematically, Benford's law applies if the distribution being tested fits the "Benford's law compliance theorem". The derivation says that Benford's law is followed if the Fourier transform of the logarithm of the probability density function is zero for all integer values. Most notably, this is satisfied if the Fourier transform is zero (or negligible) for n ≥ 1. This is satisfied if the distribution is wide (since wide distribution implies a narrow Fourier transform). Smith summarizes the matter:

Benford's law is followed by distributions that are wide compared with unit distance along the logarithmic scale. Likewise, the law is not followed by distributions that are narrow compared with unit distance … If the distribution is wide compared with unit distance on the log axis, it means that the spread in the set of numbers being examined is much greater than ten.

In short, Benford's law requires that the numbers in the distribution being measured have a spread across at least an order of magnitude.

== Tests with common distributions ==
Benford's law was empirically tested against the numbers (up to the 10th digit) generated by a number of important distributions, including the uniform distribution, the exponential distribution, the normal distribution, and others.

The uniform distribution, as might be expected, does not obey Benford's law. In contrast, the ratio distribution of two uniform distributions is well-described by Benford's law.

Neither the normal distribution nor the ratio distribution of two normal distributions (the Cauchy distribution) obey Benford's law. Although the half-normal distribution does not obey Benford's law, the ratio distribution of two half-normal distributions does. Neither the right-truncated normal distribution nor the ratio distribution of two right-truncated normal distributions are well described by Benford's law. This is not surprising as this distribution is weighted towards larger numbers.

Benford's law also describes the exponential distribution and the ratio distribution of two exponential distributions well. The fit of chi-squared distribution depends on the degrees of freedom (df) with good agreement with df = 1 and decreasing agreement as the df increases. The F-distribution is fitted well for low degrees of freedom. With increasing dfs the fit decreases but much more slowly than the chi-squared distribution. The fit of the log-normal distribution depends on the mean and the variance of the distribution. The variance has a much greater effect on the fit than does the mean. Larger values of both parameters result in better agreement with the law. The ratio of two log normal distributions is a log normal so this distribution was not examined.

Other distributions that have been examined include the Muth distribution, Gompertz distribution, Weibull distribution, gamma distribution, log-logistic distribution and the exponential power distribution all of which show reasonable agreement with the law. The Gumbel distribution – a density increases with increasing value of the random variable – does not show agreement with this law.

== Generalization to digits beyond the first ==
Log–log graph of the probability that a number starts with the digit(s) n, for a distribution satisfying Benford's law. The points show the exact formula, P(n) = log_{10}(1 + 1/n). The graph tends towards the dashed asymptote passing through (1, log_{10}e) with slope −1 in log–log scale. The example in yellow shows that the probability of a number starts with 314 is around 0.00138. The dotted lines show the probabilities for a uniform distribution for comparison. (In the SVG image, hover over a point to show its values.)

It is possible to extend the law to digits beyond the first. In particular, for any given number of digits, the probability of encountering a number starting with the string of digits n of that length – discarding leading zeros – is given by

$$\log_{10}(n + 1) - \log_{10}(n) = \log_{10}\left(1 + \frac{1}{n}\right).$$

Thus, the probability that a number starts with the digits 3, 1, 4 (some examples are 3.14, 3.142, π, 314280.7, and 0.00314005) is log_{10}(1 + 1/314) ≈ 0.00138, as in the box with the log-log graph on the right.

This result can be used to find the probability that a particular digit occurs at a given position within a number. For instance, the probability that a "2" is encountered as the second digit is

$$\log_{10}\left(1 + \frac{1}{12}\right) + \log_{10}\left(1 + \frac{1}{22}\right) + \cdots + \log_{10}\left(1 + \frac{1}{92}\right) \approx 0.109$$.

The probability that d (d = 0, 1, ..., 9) is encountered as the n-th (n > 1) digit is

$$\sum_{k=10^{n-2}}^{10^{n-1}-1} \log_{10}\left(1 + \frac{1}{10k + d}\right).$$

The distribution of the n-th digit, as n increases, rapidly approaches a uniform distribution with 10% for each of the ten digits, as shown below. Four digits is often enough to assume a uniform distribution of 10% as "0" appears 10.0176% of the time in the fourth digit, while "9" appears 9.9824% of the time.

Digit	0	1	2	3	4	5	6	7	8	9
1st	—N/a	30.1%	17.6%	12.5%	9.7%	7.9%	6.7%	5.8%	5.1%	4.6%
2nd	12.0%	11.4%	10.9%	10.4%	10.0%	9.7%	9.3%	9.0%	8.8%	8.5%
3rd	10.2%	10.1%	10.1%	10.1%	10.0%	10.0%	9.9%	9.9%	9.9%	9.8%

== Moments ==
Average and moments of random variables for the digits 1 to 9 following this law have been calculated:

- mean 3.440
- variance 6.057
- skewness 0.796
- kurtosis −0.548

For the two-digit distribution according to Benford's law these values are also known:

- mean 38.590
- variance 621.832
- skewness 0.772
- kurtosis −0.547

A table of the exact probabilities for the joint occurrence of the first two digits according to Benford's law is available, as is the population correlation between the first and second digits: ρ = 0.0561.

== See also ==
- Historic recurrence
- Zipf's law
