= Results of the 2009 Iranian presidential election =

The 2009 Iranian presidential election was characterized by huge candidate rallies in Iranian cities, and very high turnout reported to be over 80 percent. Iran holds a run-off election when no candidate receives a majority of votes, and this would have been held on 19 June 2009. At the closing of election polls, both leading candidates, Mahmoud Ahmadinejad and Mir-Hossein Mousavi, claimed victory, with both candidates telling the press that their sources have them at 58–60% of the total vote. Early reports had claimed a turnout of 32 million votes cast although the actual figure could not be determined until all of the votes were counted. Mousavi warned the Iranian people of possible vote fraud.

According to Reuters, several noted political analysts contested the results immediately. The website mowj.ir announced that Mousavi in fact was the person that received the majority of the voting and that his name was replaced by Ahmadinejad's. Mousavi urged his supporters to reject what he saw as "blatant violations" of democracy and its replacement by "the rule of authoritarianism and tyranny." He declared on Friday:

"The results announced for the 10th presidential elections are astonishing. People who stood in long lines and knew well who they voted for were utterly surprised by the magicians working at the television and radio broadcasting".

== Results ==
Candidate	Votes	%
Mahmoud Ahmadinejad	24,592,793	63.14
Mir-Hossein Mousavi	13,338,121	34.24
Mohsen Rezaee	681,851	1.75
Mehdi Karroubi	338,278	0.87
Total	38,951,043	100.00
Valid votes	38,951,043	98.93
Invalid/blank votes	420,171	1.07
Total votes	39,371,214	100.00
Registered voters/turnout	46,199,997	85.22
Source: Iran Data Portal

== Analysis ==
=== Pre-election independent poll results ===
Ken Ballen is president of Terror Free Tomorrow: the Center for Public Opinion, a nonprofit institute that researches attitudes toward extremism. Patrick Doherty is deputy director of the American Strategy Program at the New America Foundation Washington-based think tank chaired by Google CEO Eric Schmidt.

On June 15 in the Washington Post, they reported the results of their May 11–20 poll based on 1001 nationwide Iranian voter interviews (in all 30 provinces) with a 3.1% margin of error.

While Western media reported a surge for Mousavi, the results showed Ahmadinejad way ahead. "The breadth of Ahmadinejad's support was apparent in our preelection survey. During the campaign, for instance, Mousavi emphasized his identity as an Azeri, (Iran's second largest ethnic group after Persians), to woo Azeri voters." Yet poll results showed they favored Ahmadinejad 2 – 1.

Also, 18- to 24-year-olds strongly supported Ahmadinejad while Mousavi scored well only among university students and graduates and Iran's "highest-income" earners. The writers concluded "the possibility that the vote (was) not the product of widespread fraud" but reflected the electorate's true choice. They also said: "Before other countries, including the United States, jump to the conclusion that the Iranian presidential elections were fraudulent, with the grave consequences such charges could bring, they should consider all independent information. The fact may simply be that the reelection of President Ahmadinejad is what the Iranian people wanted."

=== Allegations of fraud ===
Farideh Farhi, professor at University of Hawaii, says the result was "pulled out of a hat." Among several anomalies that she addresses, she points at the "secret" Iranian government polls reported by Newsweek on June 5 estimated that Mousavi would win 16 to 18 million votes, and Ahmadinejad just 6 to 8 million and the final "official" figures, that gave Ahmadinejad 24.5 million votes, and Mousavi 13.2 million.

Mohtashami, former interior minister of Iran, who was in the election monitoring committee of Mousavi's campaign claimed that according to official censuses, the number of counted votes in 70 municipalities are more than total population of people who could vote in those regions. In all those cities Ahmadinejad won by 80% to 90% On June 17, Tabnak, the news agency close to defeated candidate Mohsen Rezaee who got only 678,240 votes in the election stated that "Mohsen Rezaee, until yesterday afternoon, found evidence that proves at least 900,000 Iranians, based on their national ID cards, voted for [him]."

BBC Iranian affairs analyst Sadeq Saba found abnormalities in the way results were announced. Instead of results by province, the "results came in blocks of millions of votes," with very little difference between the blocks in the percentages going to each candidate. This suggested that Mahmoud Ahmadinejad did equally well in rural and urban areas, while his three opponents did equally badly in their home regions and provinces as in the rest of the country. This contradicted "all precedent in Iranian politics", where Ahmadinejad had been very popular in rural areas and unpopular in the big cities, where ethnic minorities had favored anti-establishment candidates, and where candidates had tended to carry their home provinces. Another anomaly, according to British-based researcher Ali Alizadeh, is that a large turnout did not favor the opposition, since in elections, both in Iran and abroad, "those who usually don’t vote, i.e. the silent majority, only come out when they want to change the status quo." Historically, low turnout has always favored conservatives in Iranian elections, while high turnout favors reformers. That's because Iran's most reliable voters are those who believe in the system; those who are critical tend to be reluctant to participate. According to modern Middle Eastern and South Asian historian Juan Cole, there were several anomalies in the election results. Official reports gave Ahmadinejad 50% of the vote in the city of Tabriz despite the fact that this was the capital of Mousavi's home province, Eastern Azerbaijan, where Mousavi's rallies were well attended and which has traditionally given good turnouts for even "minor presidential candidates" who came from the province. Ahmadinejad also won Tehran by over 50%, even though his popularity in larger cities is considered to be low. Meanwhile, Karroubi, who received 17 percent in the first round of the 2005 presidential elections, got less than one percent of the vote this time, and lost even his own province of birth, despite the tendency for Iranian voting to follow ethnic lines. A survey of votes by a London-based think tank Chatham House found that in a third of all provinces, the official results would require that Ahmadinejad had received "not only all former conservative voters, all former centrist voters and all new voters but also up to 44 percent of former reformist voters -- despite a decade of conflict between these two groups.".

==== June 13 letter ====
On June 18, a letter was presented by Iranian filmmakers Marjane Satrapi (director of the critically Acclaimed Film Persepolis) and has since been widely circulated with Mousavi supporters. No verification of the letter has been provided. The letter was allegedly written by Interior Minister Sadegh Mahsouli to Ayatollah Khamenei on June 13 (a day after the elections), states the fraud and lists the authentic vote count. The letter was roughly translated as follows;

Salaam Aleikum.

Following your concerns regarding the results of the presidential election and per your given discretion to have Dr. Mahmoud Ahmadinejad remain as president during this sensitive juncture. Therefore, everything has been planned in a way that the public announcement will be made in accordance with the interests of the regime and the revolution. All necessary precautions have been taken to deal with any unexpected events of election aftermath and the intense monitoring of all the parties' leaders as well as the election candidates.

However, some believe that the real votes counted are as follows:

Total number of votes: 43,026,078

Mir Hossein Mousavi: 19,075,623

Mehdi Karoubi: 13,387,104

Mahmoud Ahmadinejad: 5,698,417

Mohsen Rezaee: 3,754,218

Void: 38,716

Minister of Interior

Sadegh Mahsouli

=== Disputes against fraud allegations ===
Abbas Barzegar, reporting for The Guardian, has described the Western reaction to the election results as evidence of wishful thinking. Western journalists, Barzegar argues, have been reporting primarily from the wealthier areas of the greater cities, ignoring the wide support Ahmadinejad enjoys in poor and rural communities. Juan Cole, on the other hand, rejects this interpretation. According to Cole, this analysis ignored the social development that has taken place in Iran over the last decade, the large pro-reform election victories in 1997 and 2001 (prior to the reformist voter boycott of 2005), and the fact that the concern of the electorate today is "about culture wars, not class."

United States Intelligence estimates indicate that Ahmadinejad has a stronger public support than the news coming out of Tehran suggest and a U.S. official commenting on the matter said:"Tehran is Tehran, but it’s not Iran, and it is not outside the realm of possibility that Ahmadinejad won this election".

==== Opinion polls prior to election ====
Ken Ballen and Patrick Doherty of the New America Foundation noted that an opinion poll conducted just after the election campaigning period started and prior to the highly talked-about TV debate between Mousavi and Ahmadinejad on June 3 also found twice as much support for Ahmadinejad as for Mousavi. Jon Cohen has noted that at the time of the poll only a third of Iranians were willing to express their preference, as "27 percent expressed no opinion in the election, and another 15 percent refused to answer the question at all. Eight percent said they'd vote for none of the listed candidates."

==== Reasonable size of fraud ====
The Supreme Leader Ayatollah Ali Khamenei has stated that the votes are "beyond question" due to the overwhelming size of the lead for Ahmadinejad. However, Nate Silver disagrees with claims that the mere size of the alleged fraud makes it unlikely, explaining that the lack of election monitors means that actual ballots did not need to be faked and hence fraud "is simply a matter of changing numbers on a spreadsheet." The Guardian Council of Iran has rejected this argument claiming that representatives of all candidates were present at most ballot boxes and during the process of counting votes, despite this not being constitutionally required. However, Mousavi has claimed that the government "[had] prevented some of [his] representatives from being present at polling stations."

=== Statistical analyses of results ===
==== General considerations ====
Several statisticians have attempted to determine whether the results (or some of the results) are significantly different from what is expected. This approach considers whether the election results can be modeled accurately; if not, this could indicate widespread fraud (though it could also indicate an inadequate model). Alternatively, it looks for specific results which do not fit the model; if found, these outliers could indicate fraud in those results (though they could also indicate deviation from the model for non-fraudulent reasons). Some statisticians have also argued for caution in examining claims of fraud based purely on statistical analysis of the results. While statistical analysis may indicate something unusual, in many cases this must be taken as an impetus for further investigation rather than conclusive evidence in and of itself.

==== Instances ====
Blogger and statistician Nate Silver on June 13 performed a preliminary outlier analysis, comparing Ahmadinejad's share of the vote in 2009 as compared with 2005. He wrote that a statistical analysis of the official results was ultimately inconclusive as far as determining that there was election fraud. On June 15, Silver posted regional results that he had received from a student of Iranian Studies at the University of St Andrews, who had translated them from the original Persian. He compared Ahmadinejad's 2009 results with the conservative candidates' results in the first round of the 2005 election (Ahmadinejad, Larijani and Ghalibaf), and found the results from certain provinces to be suspicious. While conservative candidates in Lorestān received only 20% in 2005, Ahmadinejad reportedly got 71% in 2009. In Tehran, on the other hand, the conservative vote was relatively speaking lower than in the previous election. Silver further compared the votes for Ahmadinejad only, and found the correlation between 2005 and 2009 to be "fairly weak". He did, however, warn against differences between the two elections and changes over time, and declined to make a judgement on the validity of the official result.

Walter Mebane performed two analyses of the province-level results. In an early simplistic model, one simply assuming an identical distribution of votes across districts, found that all 54 outlier districts had more votes for Ahmadinejad than expected. A second model uses the first-round 2005 results and second-round 2005 results to predict the 2009 results. In doing so, he finds a high number of precincts with results which do not fit the model, and finds that 2/3 of these have higher-than-expected votes for Ahmadinejad.

On June 21, Chatham House and Institute of Iranian Studies of the University of St. Andrews released a report noting several anomalies in the election results. In two provinces, Yazd and Mazandaran, turnout exceeded 100%. The report also compared voting results in the highly competitive 2005 first round and 2009. In 10 provinces, Ahmadinejad could not have achieved his reported totals through retaining his own 2005 voters, winning every voter who voted for other conservatives in 2005, winning every Rafsanjani voter, and winning every single 2005 non-voter who turned out in 2009. He would also have had to get a number of voters who had previously voted for a reformist candidate in 2005 to defect to him. The findings of the Chatham House report itself have been disputed by Reza Esfandiari and Yousef Bozorgmehr who maintain that it is fundamentally flawed and that the election data does comport to a natural outcome, allowing for some possible fraud at the local level..

==== Initial digit distribution/Benford's law ====
Another way to look for evidence of possible fraud is to analyze the data using Benford's law. This law concerns the distribution of leading digits in data which is distributed across several orders of magnitude. It states an expectation that roughly 30% of data points leading digit will have the value 1, and gives further expectations for other values and other digits. Since people cannot effectively create random numbers, there is a good chance that human-fabricated numbers will not follow Benford's law. Other experts, such as Joseph Deckert, Mikhail Myagkov and Peter C. Ordeshook from University of Oregon and California Institute of Technology, argue that fraud can move data in direction of satisfying that law. In a paper titled "Benford’s Law and the Detection of Election Fraud," Peter C. Oreshook write:

With increasing frequency websites appear to argue that the application of Benford’s Law – a prediction as to the observed frequency of numbers in the first and second digits of official election returns -- establishes fraud in this or that election. However, looking at data from Ohio, Massachusetts and Ukraine, as well as data artificially generated by a series of simulations, we argue here that Benford’s Law is essentially useless as a forensic indicator of fraud. Deviations from either the first or second digit version of that law can arise regardless of whether an election is free and fair. In fact, fraud can move data in the direction of satisfying that law and thereby occasion wholly erroneous conclusions.

Walter R. Mebane Jr., performs a 2nd-digit Benford test on the ballot-box/polling station-level data. He finds that the test shows significant deviations in the vote counts for Karroubi and Rezaee, as well as for Ahmadinejad. He concludes, "The data give very strong support for a diagnosis that the 2009 election was affected by significant fraud [...] The simplest interpretation is that in many ballot boxes the votes for Karoubi and Rezaee were thrown out while in many ballot boxes extra votes were added for Ahmadinejad." He added that for a benign interpretation, "additional evidence needs to explain how the strong support for Ahmadinejad happens to line up so strongly with the proportion of invalid votes in the ballot-box vote counts."

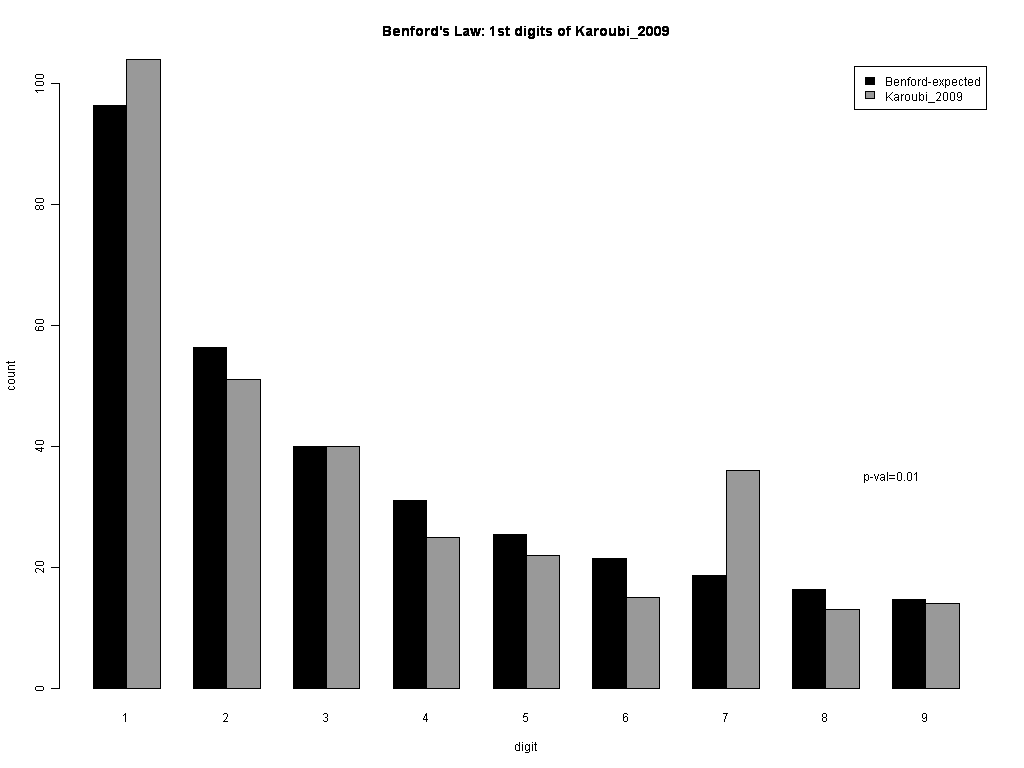
First-digit Analysis for Karoubi counts, at the district level

Analysis of the first digits of vote counts for all candidates, at the district level, was performed by Boudewijn Roukema, a cosmologist at the Nicolaus Copernicus University in Poland. Roukema, using bootstrap simulations, notes that there are significantly more vote totals for Karoubi beginning with the digit "7" than would be expected by Benford's Law.

Walter R. Mebane Jr., identifies a relationship between the proportion of invalid ballots in a ballot box and the proportion of votes for Ahmadinejad. The rate at which Ahmadinejad gains support as the proportion invalid decreases is monotonic and sometimes very steep: as the proportion invalid falls from the median value of about 0.0085 to zero, Ahmadinejad's share of the vote increases from an average of about 0.64 to an average of about 0.77. The increases in vote share for Ahmadinejad are matched by decreases in the vote share for Mousavi. Mebane argues that ballot box stuffing, or some analogous artificial augmentation of Ahmadinejad's vote counts, is the simplest way to explain these patterns.

==== Final digit distribution ====
Columbia University Ph.D. candidates Bernd Beber and Alexandra Scacco have released an analysis concluding that the patterns of the last two digits of the election results contain characteristics of human manipulation. The province vote totals possess oddities, including too many sevens in the last digits and too few fives, as well as too few non-adjacent ending digits. The authors of the report concluded that the probability of such oddities occurring naturally is only one chance in 200. After their publication, a mathematician noted that the authors had made a computational error, and that the correct probability is lower, 0.13%; this correction was confirmed by Beber and Scacco. However, Zach at AlchemyToday pointed out that the tests suffer from issues of post-hoc test selection and concluded that by Pearson's chi-square test the results did not meet confidence intervals for being non-random.

==== Consistency during result announcements ====
An early analysis by Andrew Sullivan graphed Ahmadinejad's proportion of the vote total, as election results continued to be reported during the night of the election. The consistency of his proportion throughout the additional votes being counted, it was argued, was evidence of fraud. However, this was quickly criticised by Nate Silver and later by Jordan Ellenberg.

== Provincial results ==
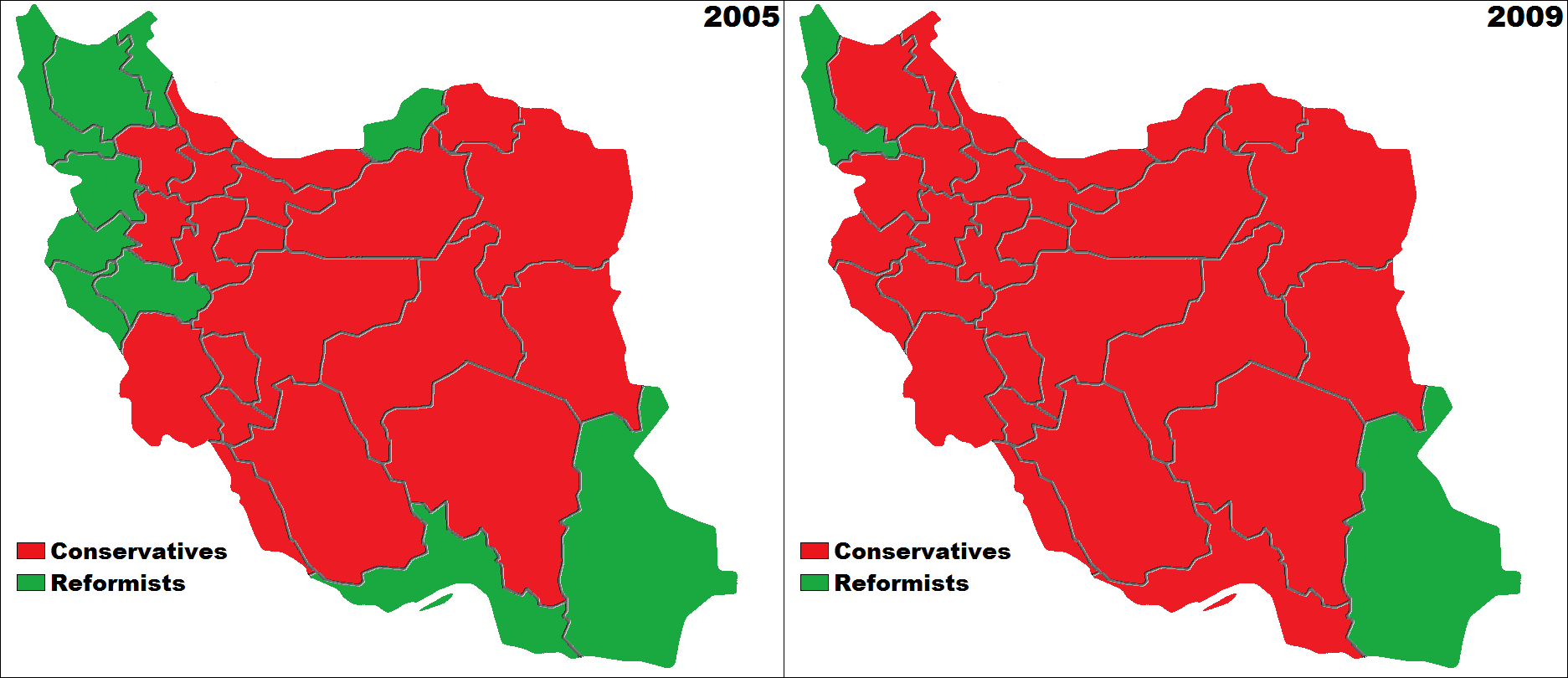
Provinces that won a conservative majority in red and provinces that won a reformist majority in green. Results of 2005 on the left and of 2009 on the right.

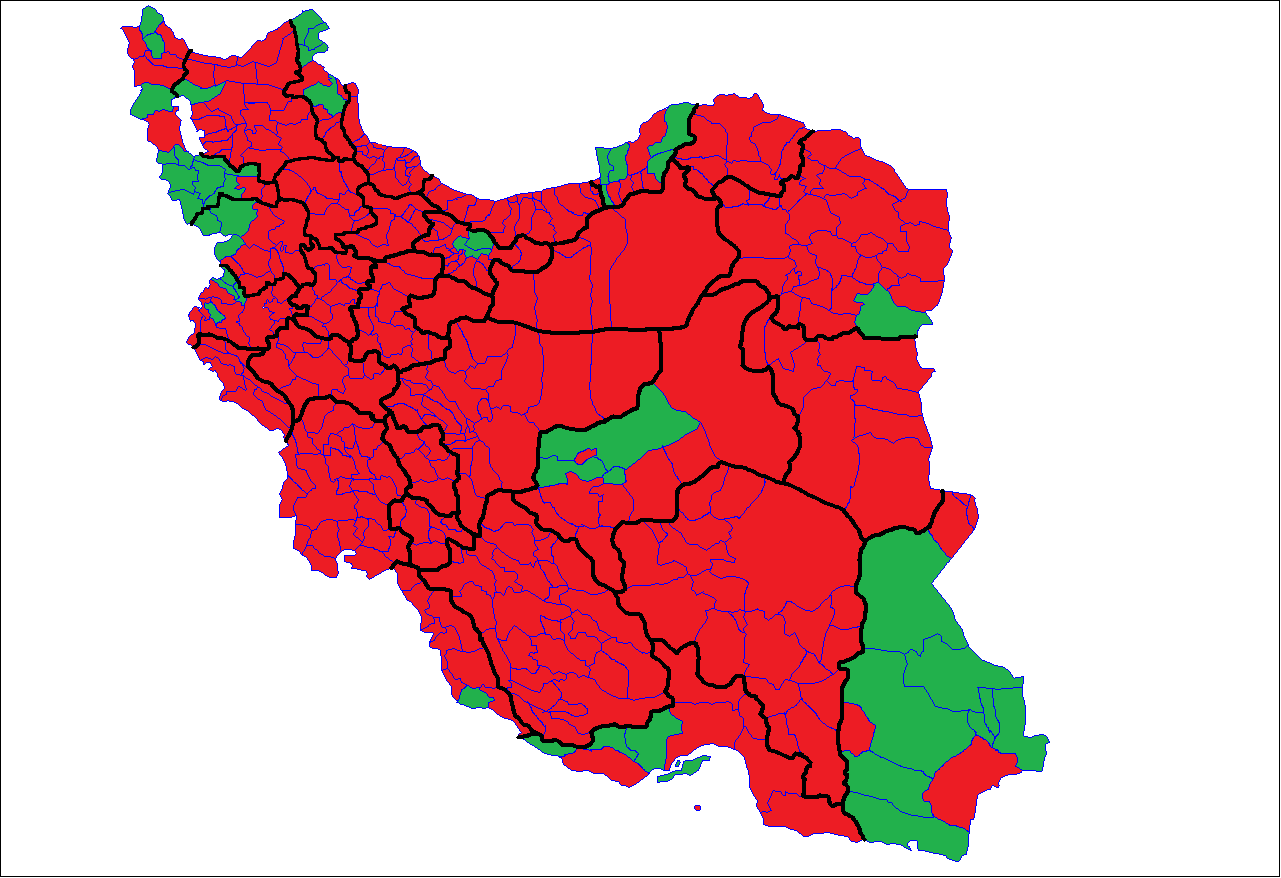
Results of 2009 election per district. Green are the districts with Mousavi majority, red the districts with Ahmadinejad majority

Province	Mahmoud Ahmadinejad	Mehdi Karroubi	Mir-Hossein Mousavi	Mohsen Rezaee	Spoiled ballots	Total votes
Ardabil	325,911	2,319	302,825	6,578	4,372	642,005
Azarbaijan, East	1,131,111	7,246	837,858	16,920	17,205	2,010,340
Azarbaijan, West	623,946	21,609	656,508	12,199	20,094	1,334,356
Bushehr	299,357	3,563	177,268	7,607	6,193	493,989
Chahar Mahaal and Bakhtiari	359,578	4,127	106,099	22,689	2,953	495,446
Fars	1,758,026	16,277	706,764	23,871	18,359	2,523,300
Gilan	998,573	7,183	453,806	12,022	11,674	1,483,258
Golestan	515,211	10,097	325,806	5,987	14,266	869,453
Hamadan	765,723	12,032	218,481	13,117	9,816	1,019,169
Hormozgan	482,990	5,126	241,988	7,237	5,683	843,024
Ilam	199,654	7,471	96,826	5,221	3,495	312,667
Isfahan	1,799,255	14,579	746,697	51,788	25,162	2,637,482
Kerman	1,160,446	4,977	318,250	12,016	10,125	1,505,814
Kermanshah	573,568	10,798	374,188	11,258	13,610	983,422
Khorasan, North	341,104	2,478	113,218	4,129	3,072	464,001
Khorasan, Razavi	2,214,801	13,561	884,570	44,809	24,240	3,181,990
Khorasan, South	285,983	928	90,363	3,962	1,920	383,157
Khuzestan	1,303,129	15,934	552,636	139,124	28,022	2,038,845
Kohgiluyeh and Boyer-Ahmad	253,962	4,274	98,937	8,542	2,311	368,707
Kurdistan	315,689	13,862	261,772	7,140	12,293	610,757
Lorestan	677,829	44,036	219,156	14,920	8,329	964,270
Markazi	572,988	4,675	190,349	10,057	7,889	785,961
Mazandaran	1,289,257	10,050	585,373	19,587	15,571	1,919,838
Qazvin	498,061	2,690	177,542	7,978	6,084	692,355
Qom	422,457	2,314	148,467	16,297	9,505	599,040
Semnan	295,177	2,147	77,754	4,440	3,790	383,308
Sistan and Baluchestan	450,269	12,504	507,946	6,616	5,585	982,920
Tehran	3,819,945	67,334	3,371,523	147,487	115,701	7,521,540
Yazd	337,178	2,565	255,799	8,406	5,908	609,856
Zanjan	444,480	2,223	126,561	7,276	5,181	585,721

== Overseas results ==
A total of 234,812 votes were cast outside Iran, out of which Mahmoud Ahmadinejad won 78,300; Mehdi Karroubi won 4,647; Mohsen Rezaee won 3,635 and Mir-Hossein Mousavi won 111,792 votes (Press TV).

== Attempts by Iranian government to restore confidence ==
Either due to the uncertainty over the election results and the protests by supporters of Musavi or to buy time for the government militia to suppress the protesters, the Guardian Council requested that the Supreme Leader extend the legal period for the registering of complaints by five days, from the original 7–10 days allotted by Iranian election laws. During this time few specific complaints were registered by the opposing parties. The Guardian Council refuted the accusations that pertained to its sphere of authority, which was during and after the elections, and opened the question of why violations prior to the election had not been raised before. Even though the main allegation of fraud were pertaining to ballot box stuffing, after a recount of 10% of the ballot boxes from the election chosen randomly, which was videotaped and done in the presence of representatives of the opposing parties, the Guardian Council certified the results and declared Ahmadinejad the winner of the 2009 Iranian presidential elections on 29 June.
