= Election forensics =

Statistical methods to possibly find voter fraud

Election forensics are methods used to determine if election results are statistically normal or statistically abnormal, which can indicate electoral fraud. It uses statistical tools to determine if observed election results differ from normally occurring patterns. These tools can be relatively simple, such as looking at the frequency of integers and using 2nd-Digit Benford's law, or can be more complex and involve machine learning techniques.

== Method ==
Election forensics can use various approaches. Methods include :

- Testing for correlation between vote share of a party and turnout (to detect ballot stuffing).
- Checking whether votes received for candidates, obey Benford's law.
- Checking for disproportionate presence of 0s in precinct vote totals, or of rounded numbers in vote shares.
- Deviation from statistical laws observed in election data.
- Using machine learning algorithms to detect anomalies.

== Application ==
Between 1978 and 2004, a 2010 review concluded that 61% of elections examined from more than 170 countries showed some signs of election fraud, with major fraud in 27% of all examined elections. Since the early 2000s, election forensics has been used to examine the integrity of elections in various countries, including Afghanistan, Albania, Argentina, Bangladesh, Cambodia, Kenya, Libya, South Africa, Uganda, Venezuela and USA.

Election forensics tools have been used to conclude, with high probability, that vote counts have been manipulated in official elections in Russia, Ukraine, Egypt, and USA.

== Compared to other methods ==
Relative to other methods of monitoring election security, such as in-person monitoring of polling places and parallel vote tabulation, election forensics has advantages and disadvantages. Election forensics is considered advantageous in that data is objective, rather than subject to interpretation. It also allows votes from all contests and localities to be systematically analyzed, with statistical conclusions about the likelihood of fraud. Disadvantages of election forensics include its inability to actually detect fraud, just data anomalies that may or may not be indicative of such. Election forensics expert Walter Mebane has noted that various election forensics methods might actually flag non-fraudulent behaviour like tactical voting as fraud. Further some experts believe that 2nd-Digit Benford's Law and other methods are useless for analyzing elections.

This can be addressed by combining election forensics with in-person monitoring. Another disadvantage is its complexity, requiring advanced knowledge of statistics and significant computing power. Additionally, the best results require a high level of detail, ideally comprehensive data from the polling place regarding voter turnout, vote counts for all issues and candidates, and valid ballots. Broad, national-level summaries have limited utility.
