= Volodymyr Paniotto =

Ukrainian sociologist

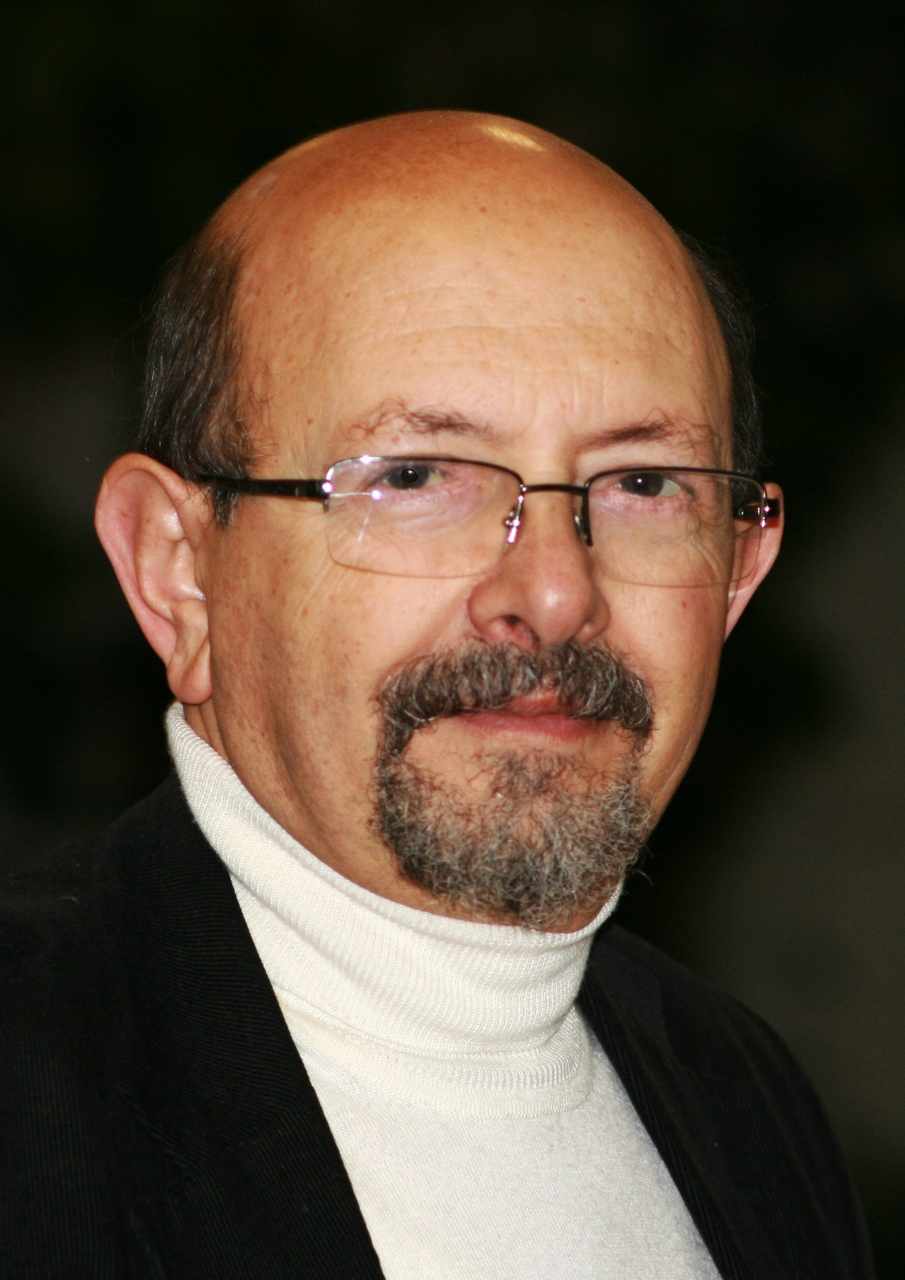
Volodymyr Illich Paniotto

Volodymyr Illich Paniotto (Ukrainian: Володимир Ілліч Паніотто; born on January 22, 1947, in Kyiv) is a Ukrainian sociologist, doctor of philosophical sciences, Director General of the Kyiv International Institute of Sociology (KIIS), and professor at the Sociology Department of Kyiv-Mohyla Academy.

== Career ==
After his graduation in 1970 from the Faculty of Mechanics and Mathematics of the Taras Shevchenko National University of Kyiv, he worked at the Philosophy Institute of the Academy of Sciences of the Ukrainian Soviet Socialist Republic as a researcher and eventually as a chair of the Sector for Computer Modeling of Social Processes. In 1990 and 1991, he chaired the Department for Methodology and Methods in Sociology at the Sociology Institute of the National Academy of Sciences of Ukraine. In 1991 and 1992, he was a professor at the Taras Shevchenko National University of Kyiv. Since 1992, he has been the Director of the Kyiv International Institute of Sociology, which he co-founded with Valeriy Khmelko and Michael Swafford. Since 1992, he has also been a professor at the Sociology Department of Kyiv-Mohyla Academy. He has participated in professional development programs at Columbia University and LMU Munich. During two semesters (1993 and 1995), he was a visiting professor at Johns Hopkins University.

Paniotto is a member of the Directing Council of the Sociological Association of Ukraine. From 1996 to 2005, he was the national representative of the European Society for Opinion and Marketing Research (ESOMAR). He is also a member of the World Association for Public Opinion Research (WAPOR), the American Association for Public Opinion Research (AAPOR), and the International Sociological Association (ISA). Since 2006, he has been the Vice-President of the Ukrainian Marketing Association (UMA).

Paniotto serves on the editorial boards of Ukrainian and Russian journals. He published research on methodological issues, poverty, occupational prestige, and xenophobia. Paniotto has published ten books and over 200 articles and chapters. The book Why a Sociologist Needs Mathematics, co-authored with Valentyn Maksymenko, won the second prize at a Soviet Union contest.

== Books ==
- Sociology in Jokes: An Entertaining Introduction, Stuttgart: Ibidem-Verlag, 2024, ISBN 9783838218571.
- War and the Transformation of Ukrainian Society (2022–23): Empirical Evidence (with Anton Grushetskyi), Hannover: Ibidem-Verlag, 2025, ISBN 9783838219448.
