= Frank Benford =

American physicist (1883–1948)

Frank Albert Benford Jr.
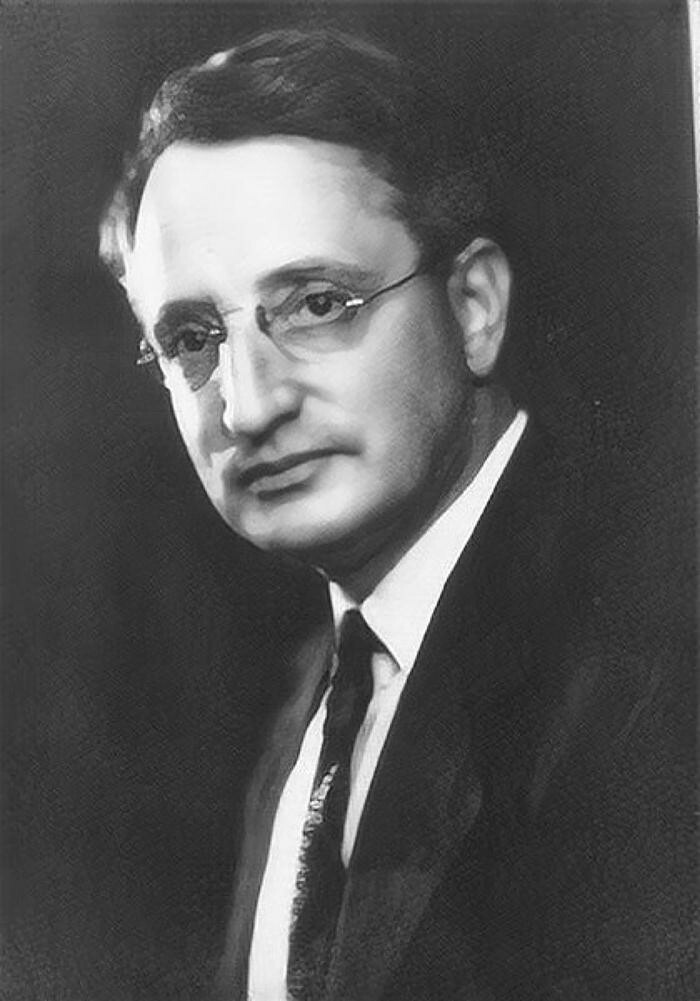
- Born: May 29, 1883; Johnstown, Pennsylvania
- Died: December 4, 1948 (aged 65); Schenectady, New York
- Education: University of Michigan
- Known for: Benford's law
- Scientific career
- Fields: Electrical engineering Physics
- Workplaces: General Electric

Frank Albert Benford Jr. (July 10, 1883 – December 4, 1948) was an American electrical engineer and physicist best known for rediscovering and generalizing Benford's law, an earlier statistical statement by Simon Newcomb, about the occurrence of digits in lists of data.

Benford is also known for having devised, in 1937, an instrument for measuring the refractive index of glass. An expert in optical measurements, he published 109 papers in the fields of optics and mathematics and was granted 20 patents on optical devices.

== Early life ==
He was born in Johnstown, Pennsylvania. His date of birth is given variously as May 29 or July 10, 1883. At the age of 6 his family home was destroyed by the Johnstown Flood.

== Education ==
He graduated from the University of Michigan in 1910.

== Career ==
Benford worked for General Electric, first in the Illuminating Engineering Laboratory for 18 years, then the Research Laboratory for 20 years until retiring in July 1948. He was working as a research physicist when he made the rediscovery of Benford's law, and spent years collecting data before publishing in 1938, citing more than 20,000 values from a diverse set of sources including statistics from baseball, atomic weights, the areas of rivers and numbering of articles in magazines.

== Death ==
He died suddenly at his home on December 4, 1948.
