= Kyiv International Institute of Sociology =

Sociological research organization

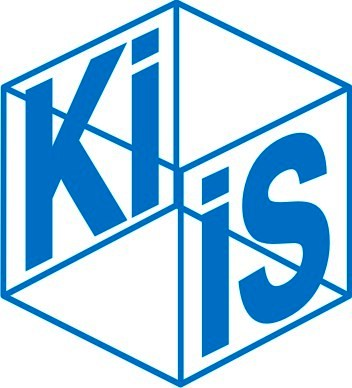
- Founded: 1990; 36 years ago
- Website: kiis.com.ua

Kyiv International Institute of Sociology (KIIS; Ukrainian: Київський міжнародний інститут соціології, romanized: Kyivskyi mizhnarodnyi instytut sotsiolohii, KMIS, КМІС) is a Ukrainian organization conducting sociological research in the fields of social and socioeconomic research, marketing research, political research, health studies, and research consulting and auditing.

== Methods ==
In its projects, KIIS uses the following research methods:

- various types of surveys (including face-to-face, self-administered, computer-assisted telephone or personal interviewing, online or postal surveys)
- in-depth interviews, ethnography research, focus groups, desk research, and other forms of qualitative research
- INPOLL online research
- content analysis
- exit polls
- expert surveys
- tracking studies
- marketing-related research methods such as mystery shopper research, retail and service delivery audits, hall tests, and passenger flow measurement

KIIS runs an Omnibus survey on a regular basis.

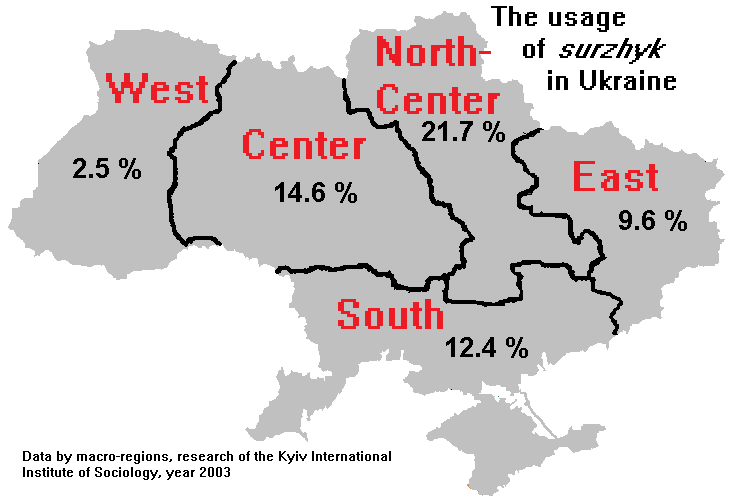
Prevalence of Surzhyk in the regions of Ukraine. Data by Kyiv International Institute of Sociology in 2003.

KIIS supports an open research Data Bank with the online key word search that is updated on a regular basis. Besides commissioned research, KIIS specialists conduct original academic research. KIIS Archive contains a collection of national and international publications by KIIS experts. KIIS published a number of books and research manuals. Since 2011, KIIS has been publishing its own journal «KIIS Review».

== Structure ==
While 40 employees work at the central KIIS office, KIIS also has representative offices in major cities of Ukraine. A team of KIIS interviewers is based at each regional center, with their total number exceeding 500 people. Ten focus group moderators work at KIIS Kyiv and regional offices. KIIS has a focus group research center and a computer-assisted telephone interviewing (CATI) center.

== Senior management ==
- KIIS president – Valeriy Khmelko, doctor of philosophical sciences, professor
- KIIS general director – Volodymyr Paniotto, doctor of philosophical sciences, professor
- KIIS executive director – Natalia Kharchenko, PhD
- KIIS financial director – Volodymyr Khmelko

== History ==
The Kyiv International Institute of Sociology (KIIS) was founded in 1990 as a research center of the Sociological Association of Ukraine. In 1992, a partnership was established with the Paragon Research International and thus the research center became a Ukrainian-American research company under the name of KIIS.

== Significance ==
KIIS has been described as one of the "leading pollsters" in Ukraine, and as a "pioneer" in the creation of standards for sociological research in the country.

KIIS also created and continues to operate the Kyiv Archive, a social science database of over 200 surveys in Ukraine from the 1990s to the current day. Following the 2022 full-scale Russian invasion of Ukraine, KIIS received help from the Consortium of European Social Science Data Archives to protect the archive's data from destruction. This archive receives more than 100 requests from researchers each year.
