= Walter Mebane =

American political scientist (born 1958)

Walter R. Mebane
- Born: November 30, 1958 (age 67); Long Branch, New Jersey
- Education: Yale University; Harvard College
- Scientific career
- Fields: Political science
- Workplaces: University of Michigan

Walter Richard Mebane, Jr. (born November 30, 1958) is a University of Michigan professor of political science and statistics and an expert on detecting electoral fraud.

== Electoral forensics ==
Mebane has studied potentially fraudulent election results, including those of the 2009 Iranian presidential election and of 1930s elections in Argentina. He authored a paper disputing the Organization of American States's claim of fraud in the 2019 Bolivian general election. In April 2004, he published a report finding that error-prone methods of counting votes (vote tabulation) in Florida in the 2000 United States presidential election led to a legal result that was the opposite of the voters' intentions.
