= Peter Ordeshook =

American political scientist

Peter C. Ordeshook
- Born: May 21, 1942 (age 84)
- Education: University of Rochester; Massachusetts Institute of Technology
- Scientific career
- Fields: Political science
- Workplaces: California Institute of Technology
- Doctoral advisor: William H. Riker

Peter Carl Ordeshook (born May 21, 1942) is an American political scientist. He was the Mary Stillman Harkness Professor of Political Science at the California Institute of Technology in Pasadena, California.

He held faculty positions at Carnegie Mellon University (1968–1982) and the University of Texas at Austin (1982–1987), where he served as the Frank C. Erwin Jr. Centennial Chair in Government. He was a fellow at the Center for Advanced Study in the Behavioral Sciences at Stanford University from 1975 to 1976, and he was the president of the Public Choice Society from 1986 to 1988. He has been a professor at Caltech since 1987. Ordeshook has authored papers and books, such as "A Theory of the Calculus of Voting" (with William H. Riker) and "Game Theory and Political Theory". He is a Fellow of the American Academy of Arts and Sciences.

== Early life and education ==
Peter Ordeshook was born in Chelsea, Massachusetts, May 21, 1942, the son of Mary Romanowicz and Peter Ordeshook whose parents had emigrated from Poland and Ukraine respectively in 1907. His Ukrainian side of the family came from Kamin-Kashyrskyi of Volyn area in Ukraine. He attended Chelsea High School.

Odershook graduated from the Massachusetts Institute of Technology in 1964 with a Bachelor of Science degree in economics, politics, and engineering. He enrolled for graduate studies at the University of Rochester and received his Ph.D. in Political Science in 1969.

== Academic career ==
=== Research ===
Ordeshook's research spans a spectrum in political science, covering areas as diverse as positive political theory/applications of game theory to politics, political economy, political behavior (in particular voting behavior), political institutions and political engineering, American politics, international relations, and comparative politics, employing mathematical modeling, experimental design, and empirical research methods.

==== Experimental and Empirical Research ====
Experimental political science employs controlled experiments to study political phenomena, test hypotheses, and understand causal relationships. McKelvey and Ordeshook were early developers of laboratory experiments that showed, among other findings, how people can use relatively simple pieces of information to make complex political decisions. They examined how uninformed voters use cues from polls and endorsements to cast the same votes they would have cast if they were more informed. One experiment focused on whether these cues could lead otherwise uninformed voters to have a thought such as “if that many voters are voting for the [rightist candidate], he can’t be too liberal” and use that fact to figure out how they would vote if they knew more about the issues (McKelvey and Ordeshook 1985). Political economist Thomas Palfrey describes their main finding as follows:

“[O]nly a few of the voters in the experiments knew where the candidates located... they proved that this information alone is sufficient to reveal enough to voters that even uninformed voters behave optimally – i.e., as if they were fully informed.”

McKelvey and Ordeshook’s experiments showed an unexpected range of conditions under which (a) uninformed voters vote competently and (b) election outcomes are identical to what they would have been if all voters were sufficiently informed. These findings prompted a reconsideration of how voters use information to make decisions.

Ordeshook's contributions extend beyond his influential theoretical and experimental work. He has also emphasized the importance of empirical testing and validation of formal theories through rigorous analysis of real world data and has made contributions to empirical research. Ordeshook and Zeng (1997) tested hypotheses generated from rational voter models, in particular the expected utility models of voting (Downs 1957, Riker and Ordeshook 1968), in the context of three-candidate presidential elections. These models posit that turnout and candidate choice decisions are influenced by, among other factors, the voter's consideration of the potential benefit of the decision weighted by the probability that the benefit would be realized. Ordeshook and Zeng found empirical evidence that expected utility calculations add little to our understanding of the decision to vote, but such strategic considerations significantly influence candidate choice decisions, especially among voters who favor a minor party candidate.

==== Constitutional Design and Comparative Politics ====
Ordeshook (1992) re-examined the importance of constitutional devices such as the separation of powers and scheduled elections, and the role of federalism for the stability of the American political system. Chen and Ordeshook (1994) studied the role of constitutional secession clauses. In the 1990s and early 2000s, Ordeshook collaborated with his students and social scientists from Russia and Ukraine, and helped each of these countries design their new constitution. Their work studied the design of a federalist system (Filippov, Ordeshook and Shvetsova, 2004), and the forensics of election fraud in Russia and Ukraine (Myagkov and Ordeshook, 2009).

In 1996-1998 Ordeshook was invited to teach Political Science and Game Theory at The International Summer School in Political Science and International Relations, funded by the Stefan Batory Foundation. At the time the Summer School was focused on sponsoring the students from the former Soviet Union and other Soviet bloc countries. These students were hoped to engage in intensive study of the subjects previously not available under Soviet regime, allowing the new generation of potential scholars to be exposed to the Western thought and democracy.

After engaging in the study of early Russian federalism (with Olga Shvetsova, Misha Myagkov, and Mikhail G. Filippov) and sharing his expertise on the subject with Russian lawmakers, Peter Ordeshook turned to studying another post-Soviet state, Ukraine. His work and collaboration with Ukrainian Sociologists Valeriy Khmelko and Melvin J. Hinich resulted in publications in Post-Soviet Affairs (1999, 2002), where they analyze the results of Ukraine's 1998 parliamentary and 1999 presidential elections using spatial model of voting, specifically concentrating on East/West divide of Ukraine.

=== Teaching and Mentoring ===
In the early to mid 1990s Ordeshook served as the Director of Graduate Studies at Caltech's Division of Humanities and Social Sciences, focusing effort on finding and attracting promising graduate students to the program, and pioneering recruitment of students from China and the former USSR. Aligned with Ordeshook’s research interest in voting, corruption and constitutional design, collaborations with many of these students resulted in research contributions including Constitutional Secession Clauses (with Yan Chen, Constitutional Political Economy,1994), Designing Federalism (with M. Filippov and O. Shvetsova, Cambridge University Press, 2004), Endogenous Time Preferences in Social Networks (with Marianna Klochko, Edward Elgar, 2005), and The Forensics of Election Fraud: Russia and Ukraine (with Mikhail Myagkov, Cambridge University Press, 2009).

== Selected publications ==
- Riker, W.H. and Ordeshook, P.C., 1968. "A Theory of the Calculus of Voting." American political science review, 62(1), pp. 25–42.
- Davis, O., Hinich, M., & Ordeshook, P. 1970. "An Expository Development of a Mathematical Model of the Electoral Process." American Political Science Review, 64(2), 426-448.
- McKelvey, R.D., and Ordeshook, P.C., 1985. “Elections with Limited Information: A Fulfilled Expectations Model Using Contemporaneous Poll and Endorsement Data as Information Sources.” Journal of Economic Theory 36: 55-85.
- Ordeshook, P.C. 1986. Game Theory and Political Theory, Cambridge University Press.
- Ordeshook, P., & Schwartz, T. 1987. "Agendas and the Control of Political Outcomes." American Political Science Review, 81(1), 179-199.
- Ordeshook, P.C., & Palfrey, T.R. 1988. "Agendas, Strategic Voting, and Signaling with Incomplete Information." American Journal of Political Science, 32(2), 441–466.
- Niou, E.M., Ordeshook, P.C., & Rose, G.F. 1989. The Balance of Power: Stability in International Systems. Cambridge University Press.
- Ordeshook, P.C., 1990. "The emerging discipline of political economy", in Alt, J.E. & Shepsle, K.A. (Eds.), Perspectives on Positive Political Economy, Cambridge University Press.
- Ordeshook, P.C., 1992. A Political Theory Primer. Routledge Press.
- Ordeshook, P.C., 1992. "Constitutional stability". Constitutional political economy, 3(2), pp. 137–175.
- Chen Y. and Ordeshook, P.C., 1994. "Constitutional secession clauses", Constitutional Political Economy, 5, pp. 45–60.
- Ordeshook, P.C. and Shvetsova, O.V., 1994. "Ethnic heterogeneity, district magnitude, and the number of parties." American journal of political science, pp. 100–123.
- Ordeshook, P.C. and Zeng, L., 1997. "Rational Voters and Strategic Voting: Evidence from the 1968, 1980 and 1992 Elections", Journal of Theoretical Politics, 9(2): 167–187.
- Ordeshook, P.C., 1998. Lessons for Citizens of a New Democracy. Edward Elgar Publishing.
- Filippov, M., Ordeshook, P.C. and Shvetsova, O., 2004. Designing federalism: A theory of self-sustainable federal institutions. Cambridge University Press.
- Klochko, M.A. and Ordeshook, P.C., 2005. Endogenous time preferences in social networks. Edward Elgar Publishing.
- Myagkov, M., Ordeshook, P.C. and Shakin, D., 2009. The forensics of election fraud: Russia and Ukraine. Cambridge University Press.
