= Wolfgang Krieger =

German mathematician

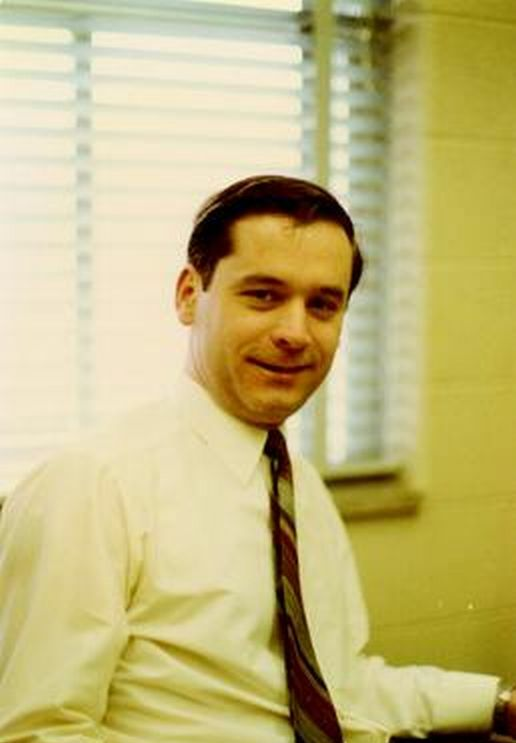
Wolfgang Krieger, Columbus 1970

Wolfgang Krieger (born 3 June 3, 1940, Garmisch-Partenkirchen) is a German mathematician, specializing in analysis.

Krieger studied mathematics and physics at the Ludwig-Maximilians-Universität München from 1959, where he obtained his doctorate in 1968 under Elmar Thoma with the thesis Über Maßklassen. Krieger studied at Harvard University from 1962 to 1965, earning a master's degree in 1964. From 1966 to 1968 he was a research assistant in Munich; and from 1968 assistant professor, from 1970 associate professor and from 1972 full professor at Ohio State University. For the academic year 1973–1974 he was a visiting professor at the University of Göttingen. In 1974, until his retirement in 2006, he was a professor at Heidelberg University. From 1985 to 1987 he was Dean of the Faculty of Mathematics.

His research deals with ergodic theory, dynamical systems, and operator algebras. Cuntz-Krieger algebras, introduced in 1980, are named after him and Joachim Cuntz.

Krieger was a visiting scholar at IHES and Paris VI University in 1977–1978, at the University of Ottawa in 1982–1983, at the Almaden Research Center of IBM in 1988–1989, and at the Hebrew University of Jerusalem in 2005–2006. In 1997 he was a Fellow of the Japan Society for the Promotion of Science. He was elected a Fellow of the American Mathematical Society in 2012. He was an invited speaker with the talk On Generators in Ergodic Theory at the ICM in Vancouver in 1974.

== Selected publications ==
- On non-singular transformations of a measure space. I, Zeitschrift für Wahrscheinlichkeitstheorie und Verwandte Gebiete, Vol. 11, No. 2, 1969, pp. 83–97. doi:10.1007/BF00531811
- On entropy and generators of measure-preserving transformations, Transactions of the American Mathematical Society, Vol. 149, 1970, pp. 453–464. doi:10.1090/S0002-9947-1970-0259068-3
- On ergodic flows and the isomorphism of factors, Mathematical Annals, Vol. 223, 1976, pp. 19–70 doi:10.1007/BF01360278
- with Alain Connes: Measure space automorphisms, the normalizers of their full groups, and approximate finiteness, Journal of Functional Analysis, Vol. 24, 1977, pp. 336–352 doi:10.1016/0022-1236(77)90062-3
- with Joachim Cuntz: A class of C*-algebras and topological Markov chains, Inventiones Mathematicae, Vol. 56, 1980, pp. 251–268. doi:10.1007/BF01390048
- On the Subsystems of Topological Markov Chains, Ergodic Theory and Dynamical Systems, Vol. 2, 1982, pp. 195–202 doi:10.1017/S0143385700001516
- with Mike Boyle: Periodic points and automorphisms of the shift, Trans. Amer. Math. Soc., Vol. 302, 1987, pp. 125–149 doi:10.1090/S0002-9947-1987-0887501-5
- with Brian Marcus and Selim Tuncel: On automorphisms of Markov chains, Trans. Amer. Math. Soc., Vol. 333, 1992, pp. 531–565 doi:10.1090/S0002-9947-1992-1099353-3
