= Valeriy Khmelko =

Ukrainian sociologist (1939–2021)

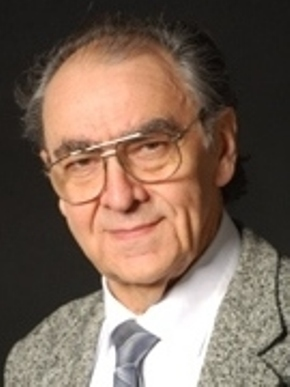
Khmelko in 2011

Valériy Khmelkó (Ukrainian: Валерій Хмелько; 30 July 1939 – 30 October 2021) was a Ukrainian sociologist, Professor at the Sociology Department of the National University of Kiev-Mohyla Academy, and President of the Kyiv International Institute of Sociology.

== Career ==
Valeriy Khmelko was born in Kyiv. He held graduate degrees in physics (1961) and philosophy (1971) and a postgraduate degree (candidate of sciences, (1974) from the Taras Shevchenko National University of Kiev. From 1975 to 1990, he was a researcher at the Institute of Party History of the Central Committee of the Communist Party of Ukraine. He was a doctor of philosophical sciences (dissertation on the methodological and procedural issues of sociological research of the influence of the scientific technological revolution on personality directedness of an industrial worker; defended in Kyiv in 1987).

From 1990 to 1992, Khmelko was in charge of the Kiev Republican Sociological Center for Academic and Applied Research of the Sociological Association of Ukraine. In 1992, on the basis of this Center, he co-founded, together with Volodymyr Paniotto and Michael Swafford, Kiev International Institute of Sociology and became its President. He was also a founder of the Sociology Department of the National University of Kiev-Mohyla Academy, which he chaired 1992 to 2000 and 2008 to 2010. He also founded the School for Social Sciences and Social Technologies at the same university, for which he served as a dean from 2000 to 2002. Khmelko was a visiting professor in 1993 and a visiting scholar in 1992, 2000 and 2001 at the Sociology Department of Johns Hopkins University (United States). In 1971, he joined the Soviet Sociological Association and served as its presidium member 1987 to 1991. In 1990, he joined the Sociological Association of Ukraine and served as its vice-president 1990 to 1992, as its directing board member 1998 to 2004, and as a member for its Professional Ethics Committee from 2002 to 2007. Since 1998, he has been a member of the International Sociological Association (ISA) and served on the editorial board of the ISA journal "The International Journal of Sociology".

Khmeko specialized in the fields of macrosociology and sociology of personality (sociological approach to social psychology). In the field of macrosociology, he forecasted that information production would become the dominant production type [1], suggested that socio-genesis was complete when there appear beings capable of creating symbolic systems [2], developed a theory of historical changes of a macrostructure dominant of society reproduction processes [3-6], analyzed Russian-Ukrainian linguistic and ethnic as well as bi-ethnic heterogeneity of ethno-national structures of Ukrainian regions [9, 16, 19]. In the field of sociological perspectives on social psychology (sociology of personality), Valeriy Khmelko suggested conceptualizing personality as a system of internal regulation of human social activity and personality directedness as its dispositional structure; he also developed procedures for measuring and analyzing interrelations of cognitive and emotive components of social dispositions [7, 8].

As stated by Volodymyr Paniotto, Khmelko's close colleague, in one of his early articles, Khmelko suggested a theory of dominant production types that foreran the key idea of the well-known Alvin Toffler's work "Third Wave".

== Selected publications ==
- 1. Виробничі відносини і суспільне виробництво життя // Вісник Київського університету. Серія філософії. — 1973. — № 7.
- 2. Найзагальніші особливості суспільних відносин // Філософська думка. — 1974. — N 6.
- 3. Содержание и структура производственных отношений как предмета общесоциологического исследования. Диссертация на соискание ученой степени кандидата философских наук. К.,1976.
- 4. Социально-политические проблемы НТР и идеологическая борьба. — К.: Политиздат Украины, 1978. — 368 с. (в соавторстве с В. В. Косолаповым и другими)
- 5. Производство как общественный процесс (актуальные проблемы теории и практики) / Отв. ред. В. И. Толстых. — М.: Мысль, 1986. — 350 с. (в соавторстве с В. И. Толстых, В. М. Межуевым, В. Н. Мазуром и Э. М. Агабабьяном).
- 6. Общественное производство жизни: структура процессов и ее динамика // Общественные науки. — 1987. — № 2
- 7. Социальная направленность личности: некоторые вопросы теории и методики социологических исследований. — К.: Политиздат Украины, 1988. — 279 с.
- 8. НТР-контрастні групи промислових робітників: співвідношення когнітивних та емотивних структур життєвих диспозицій // Філософська думка. — 1990. — № 6
- 9. Третий год независимости: уроки вторых президентских выборов // Современное общество, Харьков, № 4, 1994
- 10. The Russian Factor and Territorial Polarization in Ukraine // The Harriman Review, vol. 9, № 1-2 (Spring), N.Y., 1996 (with D.Arel)
- 11. Regionalism and Ethnic and Linguistic Cleavages in Ukraine // Contemporary Ukraine: Dynamics of Post-Soviet Transformation. — New York, London: M.E. Sharpe, 1998 (with A.Wilson)
- 12. Complexity of Activities and Personality under Conditions of Radical Social Change: A Comparative Analysis of Poland and Ukraine // Social Psychology Quarterly, Vol.63, No.3, 2000 (with M.Kohn and others)
- 13. Макросоциальные изменения в Украине: годы независимости // Мониторинг общественного мнения: экономические и социальные перемены. Москва: ВЦИОМ, 2001, № 5 (55)
- 14. Macrosocial Change in Ukraine: the years of independence // Sisyphus. Social Studies. — 2002. — Vol. XVI
- 15. Transformations of Social Structure in Ukraine during the Decade of Independence // Studia Socjologiczne (Warszawa). — 2004. — nr.4
- 16. Лінгво-етнічна структура України: регіональні особливості та тенденції змін за роки незалежності // Наукові записки НаУКМА. Соціологічні науки. — 2004. — т.32
- 17. Соціальні структури і особистість: дослідження Мелвіна Л.Кона і його співпрацівників / Пер. з англ. за наук. ред. В.Є.Хмелька. — К.: Вид. дім "Києво-Могилянська академія, 2007. — 559 с.
- 18. Social Structure and Personality during the Process of Radical Social Change: A Study of Ukraine in Transition // New Frontiers in Comparative Sociology / edited by Masamichi Sasaki (International Studies in Sociology and Social Anthropology, vol.109). — Leiden: Brill, 2009. — P.119-170 (with M.Kohn, V.Paniotto and Ho-fung Hung)
- 19. Социальная основа расхождения электоральных предпочтений двух частей Украины на выборах 2004—2007 годов // Социология вчера, сегодня, завтра. Новые ракурсы.— СПб.: Эйдос, 2011. — С. 398—409.

The latest study, conducted by Valery Khmelko, was "Analysis of social factors of predominance of pro-European or pro-Russian geopolitical orientations in the regions of Ukraine." The results were published by his student in the article.

== Sources ==
- Соціологія: короткий енциклопедичний словник / Під заг. ред. В.І.Воловича. — К.: Укр. Центр духовн. Культури, 1998. — 736 с.
- Хто є хто в західній та вітчизняній соціології / Наук. ред. В. М.Піча. — Львів: «Світ», 1999. — 160 с.
- Хто є хто в Україні. — К.: «K.I.C.», 2007. — 1136 c.
