= Ted Paige =

British physicist and engineer

- Born: Edward George Sydney Paige; 18 July 1930; Northiam, England
- Died: 20 February 2004 (aged 73)
- Education: Rye Grammar School
- Alma mater: Reading University
- Partner: Helen Gill
- Children: 4
- Awards: EPS Europhysics Prize (1979)
- Scientific career
- Fields: Physics; Electrical Engineering; Acousto-electronics; Optoelectronics
- Workplaces: Radar Research Establishment; Oxford University
- Doctoral advisor: William Mitchell

Professor Edward George Sydney Paige FRS (18 July 1930 – 20 February 2004), known as Ted Paige, was a British physicist and engineer. His main areas of research were semiconductor devices to improve radar, including work on surface acoustic waves, and optical techniques using programmable phase plates.

== Early life and education ==
Paige was an only child born and raised in Northiam, Sussex, where he developed a lifelong interest in ornithology. Paige was raised in “a thatched cottage, reputedly of sixteenth-century vintage, in Northiam, a village on the border between Kent and East Sussex.” Paige's father, in keeping with family tradition, worked for the railway, serving the stationmaster at the town's railway station. The family did not have running water until Paige was five years old, and did not have electricity until some time later. His parents “were encouraging and supportive but…had little contact with the world of learning or with intellectual pursuits.” An only child, Paige “developed a passion for bird watching, which he sustained throughout his life. He also “suffered periodically from chest complaints,” and his mother later told him that the doctor had lowered his fees for the family to make treatment affordable. Paige described this as “the source of his subsequent socialist leanings.”

From 1935 to 1941, Paige attended Sandhurst primary school in Kent. He went on to Rye Grammar School, where he planned a career in the Navy. A member of the Sea Cadets, he expected to attend the Royal Naval College at Dartmouth, Devon, after leaving school. He eventually decided, however, that military regimentation did not appeal to him. He “remained throughout his life of an agnostic disposition.”

It was at Rye Grammar School that he developed an interest in science. He performed experiments on his own and created explosives. It was only at the suggestion of his headmaster, who recognized his gifts, that Paige, whose family had no history of higher education, stayed on into the sixth form. At first his scientific interests were focused on biology, but when the school hired a master, Leslie Elliott, to teach physics and chemistry, Paige was attracted to those subjects. His results on the test for a Higher School Certificate earned him a County Scholarship, allowing him to proceed to Reading University to read physics.

During his undergraduate years (1949–52) Paige studied physics, chemistry and mathematics, earning a first-class honours degree in physics. He also earned a British Association for the Advancement of Science Exhibition. While he was an undergraduate, he held a summer job in an electronics factory.

Paige proceeded to doctoral studies. His supervisor was Dr (later Sir) William Mitchell (FRS 1986). Indeed, Paige was the first doctoral student that Mitchell ever supervised. Their association developed into a decades-long collaboration and lifelong friendship. Paige's doctoral research was focused on radiation damage in quartz caused by X-rays and neutrons, and established that “optical absorption in the visible part of the spectrum was attributable to aluminium impurities.” Shortly after marrying, Paige received his PhD in 1955.

== Career ==
Given the choice of either pursuing a postdoctoral fellowship at the National Research Council in Canada or accepting a Civil Service Commission Junior Fellowship at a government-run research establishment of his choice in the UK, Paige chose the latter, ultimately choosing the Radar Research Establishment (RRE) in Malvern, where the research was focused entirely on pure science. Paige began working at that institution in 1955 with the title of Junior Research Fellow to the Deputy Chief Scientific Officer. In 1973, he was promoted to Deputy Chief Scientific Officer. In 1976, the RRE was incorporated into the Royal Signals and Radar Establishment.

Eventually, Paige joined the RRE's Transistor Physics Division, led by Alan Gibson, where he Paige “studied the behaviour of free carriers in semiconductors.”

In the late 1950s he taught classes at Birmingham University and led seminars in the Physics Department of Oxford University.

In 1966 Paige went to Copenhagen, where he spent six months as a visiting professor teaching a course on solid state plasmas.

In 1968 he became leader of a research group investigating Rayleigh waves on semiconductor surfaces. Its findings were useful in designing the radar for the RAF's Nimrod reconnaissance aircraft, and the team won the Ministry of Defence's Wolfe Award. Paige also teamed up with Dr Tom McLean, and together they wrote twenty papers on germanium.

In 1970, Paige formed a team, the UK SAW Liaison Group, that engaged in research and development into surface acoustic wave (SAW) devices. Th group “flourished for most of a decade” and “was a fruitful venture, engendering good collaboration between university, industry and government groups.” The group's work resulted in many patents, publications and applications, and “the team's reputation spread internationally.” The team, which included physicists Graham Marshall, Meirion Lewis, and Dennis Maines, developed SAW electronic filters, which had many applications, including mobile phones, when they later emerged. The team “developed close links with several university groups, first of all in the field of acousto-electronics. The liaisons extended to groups in France, and for some period there were regular Anglo-French consortia meetings, with the British contingent led by Paige.”

In 1977 Paige became the Chair of Electrical Engineering at Oxford and a Fellow of St. John's College, titles he retained until 1997, which involved a shift in focus from physics to engineering and from research to a com bination of research and teaching. He has been described as “a brilliant teacher.” In 1984, for a brief time he was acting head of the Engineering Science Department. “In the late 1970s he initiated the introduction of information technology into the department, and 10 years later he introduced optoelectronics. Both areas are flourishing.” At Oxford he focused on restructuring the department and upgrading the teaching laboratories. In the 1980s he developed an interest in optoelectronics, including programmable light modulators for sub-micron lithography.

In 1986–87, he spent a sabbatical year at Stanford University, where he worked with Professor J. W. Goodman on optoelectronics. Returning to Oxford he “developed an interest in programmable light modulators, using them to develop optical techniques with potential for sub-micron lithography....A three-dimensional image system for use as a head-mounted display also followed from his work.”

In the early 1990s he “was opening up an important new field using a ferroelectric spatial light modulator (SLM) in a novel phase-only mode.…Within a few years a wealth of developments and applications were found by Paige and his group."

In 1997, Paige retired from Oxford, but he was “active and productive” in his role as an emeritus professor, and received a Leverhulme Fellowship.

Paige was also involved with the Science Research Council.

== Illness and death ==
Paige was diagnosed with HFE hereditary haemochromatosis in 1996 a genetic disorder that creates iron overload in the body. From 2000 until he died in 2004, Paige was a director of the Haemochromatosis Society, a group founded in 1990 to help with awareness and research into genetic haemochromatosis. Paige used his statistical expertise to help the society to better survey and document the disease. Paige died of liver cancer in 2004 which was caused by his genetic condition.

== Personal life ==
He was married to Helen Gill and they had four children.

== Honors and awards ==
=== Fellowships ===
In 1967 Paige was named a Fellow of the Institute of Physics; in 1977, a Fellow of St John's College, Oxford; in 1978, a Fellow of the Institute of Electrical Engineers; in 1983, a Fellow of the Royal Society; in 1997, a Leverhulme Emeritus Fellow.

=== Honorary appointments ===
In 1966, he was a visiting professor at the Technical University of Denmark, Copenhagen; in 1986, a visiting professor at Stanford University.

=== Awards ===
In 1978 he received the Institute of Physics' Duddell Medal and the Institute of Acoustics' Rayleigh Medal. In the same year he won the Gabor Medal from the Institute of Physics. In the 1980s he developed an interest in optoelectronics, including programmable light modulators for sub-micron lithography.

== Works ==
- Paige, E.G.S.; Sucharov, L.O.D. (2001). "Enhancement of imaging performance of a variable focus Fresnel zone plate based on a single, binary, phase-only SLM". Optics Communications. 193 (1–6): 27–38. doi:10.1016/s0030-4018(01)01178-6.
- Mannivannan, N.; Neil, M.A.A.; Paige, E.G.S. (2000). "Optical multiple pattern recognition with a correlator using a single binary phase-only filter". Optics Communications. 178 (1): 37–51. doi:10.1016/s0030-4018(00)00633-7.
- Chen, H.Y.; Mayhew, N.; Paige, E.G.S.; Yang, G.G. (1996). "Enhancement of submicron optical lithography performance using phase-only pupil filters". Microelectronic Engineering. 30 (1–4): 95–98. doi:10.1016/0167-9317(95)00202-2.

=== Patents ===
- Maines James Dennis, Paige Edward George Sydney: Frequency sensitive detecting and measuring circuits based on the acoustic electric effect. National Research Development Corporation. May 2, 1972: US 3660756
- Maines James Dennis, Paige Edward George Sydney: Application of acousto-electric oscillators. Secr Defence. Apr, 19 1972: GB 1271495-A
- David John Gunton, Edward George Sydney Paige: Directional coupler having interdigital comb electrodes, 31 May 1977: US 4027254
- Edward George Sydney Paige: Surface acoustic wave devices, 17 August 1976: US 3975697 and US 3978437
- With F. G. Marshall: Acoustic surface wave devices. 1974:GB 1372235
- With F. G. Marshall: Acoustic surface wave device amplifiers. 1975:GB 1385055
- With P. D. Bloch & M. E. Barnard: Inclined chirp transducer. 1983: GB 2145893
