= Varadan =

Varadan is a surname. Notable people with the surname include:

- Komala Varadan, Indian dancer
- Vasundara Varadan, Indian professor
