= Roger Howe =

Roger Howe may refer to:

- Roger Evans Howe (born 1945), professor of mathematics at Yale University
- Roger T. Howe (born 1957), professor of electrical engineering at Stanford University
