= Richard M. White =

American electrical engineer (1930–2020)

- Born: 1930
- Died: August 17, 2020 (aged 89–90)
- Education: Harvard University
- Known for: Inventing the Interdigital Transducer (IDT)
- Scientific career
- Fields: Electrical Engineering, MEMS, Ultrasonic
- Workplaces: UC Berkeley, BSAC
- Notable students: Amit Lal

Richard Manning White (1930 – August 17, 2020) was an electrical engineer and a professor emeritus in the Department of Electrical Engineering and Computer Sciences at UC Berkeley and a Co-Founding Director of the Berkeley Sensor & Actuator Center (BSAC). He and Richard S. Muller founded the BSAC in 1986. They received 2013 IEEE/RSE James Clerk Maxwell Medal for pioneering innovation and leadership in MEMS technology. White is known for inventing the Interdigital Transducer (IDT) and for his surface acoustic wave work, he received the 2003 Rayleigh Award. He received the IEEE Cledo Brunetti Award in 1986.

He was born in 1930 and grew up in Denver. He attended Harvard University for his B.A. degree in 1951 and A.M. in 1952. He continued on at Harvard, earning his Ph.D. in Electrical Engineering in 1956 with his dissertation on the scattering of sound waves at a cylindrical bore in a solid. He researched microwave devices at General Electric while at Harvard. After Harvard, White worked as a research scientist in the Microwave Division at General Electric. White joined the Electrical Engineering Department at UC Berkeley in 1962 where he invented interdigitated transducers for surface acoustic wave devices.

White received the Guggenheim Fellowship in 1968 and was made a Fellow of the IEEE in 1972 "for contributions to the discovery and applications of surface elastic waves." He was also a member of the National Academy of Engineering and a Fellow of the American Association for the Advancement of Science.

White was still active in his field when he died on August 17, 2020. A tree and associated plaque honors his memory in the UC Berkely Botanical Garden.
