= HEPL =

HEPL may refer to:

- Haute École de la Province de Liège, group of three colleges in Belgium
- Hansen Experimental Physics Laboratory, research lab at Stanford University, United States
