= Physical acoustics =

Study of acoustic wave interactions with physical mediums

Physical acoustics is the area of acoustics and physics that studies interactions of acoustic waves with a gaseous, liquid or solid medium on macro- and micro-levels. This relates to the interaction of sound with thermal waves in crystals (phonons), with light (photons), with electrons in metals and semiconductors (acousto-electric phenomena), with magnetic excitations in ferromagnetic crystals (magnons), etc. Some recently developed experimental techniques include photo-acoustics, acoustic microscopy and acoustic emission. A long-standing interest is in acoustic and ultrasonic wave propagation and scattering in inhomogeneous materials, including composite materials and biological tissues.

There are two main classes of problems studied in physical acoustics. The first one concerns understanding how the physical properties of a medium (solid, liquid, or gas) influence the propagation of acoustic waves in this medium in order to use this knowledge for practical purposes. The second important class of problems studied in physical acoustics is to obtain the relevant information about a medium under consideration by measuring the properties of acoustic waves propagating through this medium.

== See also ==
- Acoustic attenuation
- Acoustic levitation
- Acoustic streaming
- Acousto-electric effect
- Acousto-optics
- Elastic waves
- Interdigital transducer
- Longitudinal wave
- Love wave
- Nonlinear acoustics
- Picosecond ultrasonics
- Sonoluminescence
- Rayleigh wave
- Shear wave
- Sound absorption
- Sound velocity
- Thermoacoustics
- Acoustic radiation force
