= Rzhanov Institute of Semiconductor Physics =

Research institute in Novosibirsk, Russia

Rzhanov Institute of Semiconductor Physics of the Siberian Branch of the RAS
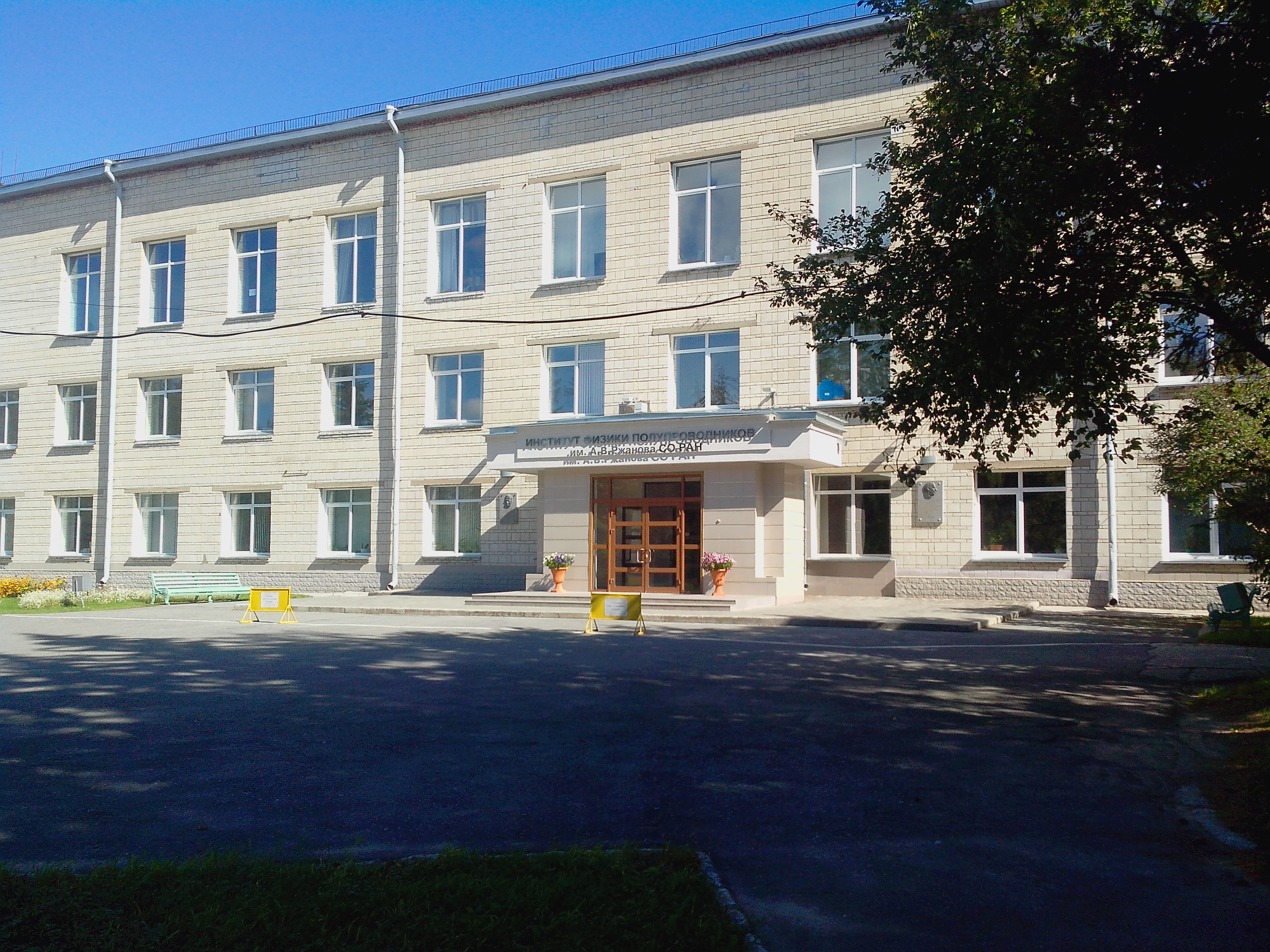
- Founder: Anatoly Rzhanov
- Established: 1964
- Director: Alexander Latyshev
- Owner: Siberian Branch of the Russian Academy of Sciences
- Address: Lavrentyev Prospekt 13, Novosibirsk, 630090, Russia
- Location: Novosibirsk, Russia
- Website: www.isp.nsc.ru

Rzhanov Institute of Semiconductor Physics of the Siberian Branch of the RAS (Russian: Институт физики полупроводников имени А. В. Ржанова СО РАН) is a research institute in Akademgorodok of Novosibirsk, Russia. It was founded in 1964.

== History ==
The institute was created in 1964 by merging the Institute of Solid State Physics and Semiconductor Electronics and the Institute of Radiophysics and Electronics. In the 1970s, the institute began to work on developing molecular-beam epitaxy methods.

== Scientific activity ==
Development of the physical fundamentals of microelectronics, acousto-electronics, microphotoelectronics, quantum electronics; the study of physical phenomena in semiconductor thin-film structures etc.
