= Spherical surface acoustic wave (SAW) sensor =

Spherical surface acoustic wave sensors use a type of surface acoustic wave (SAW) that travels along the surface of a medium exhibiting elasticity with exponentially decaying amplitude along depth. MEMS-IDT technology allows the use of SAW waves to sense various gases. Sensitivity up to 10 ppm of hydrogen using a spherical Ball SAW device is obtained.

== Principles ==
Conventional planar SAW sensors are based on principle that the parameters such as amplitude, speed and phase of Surface acoustic wave changes on adsorption of gas molecules. Limitation of planar SAW based sensors is that the change in above mentioned parameters is very small due to limited path offered to Surface acoustic wave by planar sensor. In the case of Spherical sensors, surface acoustic waves make several round trips along the equator of a ball, which offer longer paths to Surface acoustic wave. Hence, even smaller changes in parameters are amplified with multiple turns, which increases the sensitivity of the sensor considerably.
