= Jeffrey H. Collins =

British electrical engineer

Jeffrey Hamilton Collins
- Born: 22 April 1930; Luton, England
- Died: 23 September 2015 (aged 85); Gullane, Scotland
- Education: University of London (BSc, MSc, DSc); Edinburgh Napier University (Hon DEng)
- Occupation: Electrical engineer
- Years active: 1951–2010
- Known for: Analog signal processing Surface acoustic wave devices
- Awards: FRSE (1983); FREng (1981)

Jeff Collins (22 April 1930 – 23 September 2015) was a British electrical engineer who directed and researched experimental physics, robotics, microelectronics, communications technologies and parallel computing.

Moving between academia, commercial and military research throughout his career, he proved to be a leader demonstrated in his numerous directorships, successful fund-raising and his recreational interests of sports. Institutions he worked for included Automation & Robotics Research Institute at the University of Texas at Arlington, Rockwell International, University of Edinburgh, University of Glasgow, GEC, Ferranti, Hansen Experimental Physics Laboratory at Stanford University, Wolfson Microelectronics Institute, Advent Technology Venture Capital Group, Artemis Intelligent Power, Lothian Regional Council and Edinburgh Napier University.

He contributed to many academic papers, such as Surface Wave Transducers and Microwave magnetostatics

In the 1970s and 80s working for University of Edinburgh he secured funding for Surface acoustic wave devices research and then used them in a Skynet (satellite) receiver which achieved faster synchronisation.

== Education ==
Jeffrey Hamilton Collins was born in Luton, England on 22 April 1930 and was educated at the Royal Grammar School in Guildford, Surrey. He received a BSc in Physics, an MSc in Mathematics and later a DSc all from the University of London. Collins was further awarded an honorary DEng by Edinburgh Napier University in 1997.

== Career ==
He started his technical career in the 1940s as a technician in the Department of Physics at Guy's Hospital Medical School. From 1951 to 1956 he gained experience in microwave tubes and ferrite parametric amplifiers during employment at General Electric Company, Wembley and at Ferranti, Edinburgh. From 1957 to 1966 he was a lecturer in Electrical engineering at the University of Glasgow under John Lamb, teaching and researching in microwave devices. He then took up appointment as a research engineer at the Hansen Experimental Physics Laboratory, Stanford University. Here he was introduced to signal processing capabilities of surface acoustic wave devices, magnetic garnet delay lines for correlation and pulse compression applications. In addition to his technical collaborations with Gordon Kino, Bert Auld, Hank (WR) Smith and John Shaw (HEPL Stanford), he had industrial collaborations with Tom Bristol (Hughes Aircraft), Tom Reeder (United Technologies), Leland Solie (Sperry Corporation) etc. and subsequently he served as Director of Physical Sciences at Rockwell International.

Collins was an innovator in 1969 when he, with Ted Paige and Dennis Maines from RSRE persuaded the IEE Electronics Division to underwrite the first International Specialist Seminar on surface acoustic wave devices held in Aviemore, to expand interest in this new technology in the UK and beyond. Further events were held in 1973 (IEE Conference Publication 109), with Collins as Joint Organiser with Tom Bristol and Tom Reeder, and repeated again in 1976 (IEE Conference Publication 144).

In 1970, Collins was recruited back to the UK to join the University of Edinburgh to take up a SRC sponsored position as a research Professor, later converted to a personal chair in Industrial Electronics. He brought expertise in the emerging field of surface acoustic wave (SAW) and magnetostatic wave devices, securing significant financial support for the University. His research team comprised Douglas Adam, Barry Darby, Peter Grant, John Hannah, Mervyn Jack, David Morgan, John Owens, etc. with Dennis Lambert leading the device fabrication on Lithium niobate and Quartz polished substrates. Following the Aviemore seminars SAW became a UK major R&D activity at this time with companion investigations by Charles Sandbank (Standard Telecommunication Laboratories), Cyril Brown (General Electric Company), John Palfreeman (Philips), Ted Paige and Denis Maines (RSRE Malvern) and Eric Ash (University College London).

In this era, before digital signal processing, these analogue devices offered a unique way to implement complex receiver designs. His University research team, under John Hannah and David Morgan, designed and delivered a prototype receiver [11] for the UK Skynet military communication system, which synchronised 100 times faster than the existing design. Much of this research was based on spectrum analysis [12] for identifying or acquiring signals, with Collins publishing several papers in the early 1980s on Electronic Support Measures [13].

As Head of the Electrical Engineering Department from 1977 to 1984 Collins also served as the Chairman of the Wolfson Microelectronics Institute (WMI), advising on technology transfer. WMI was floated in January 1985 as the private company, Wolfson Microelectronics. The company's growth accelerated markedly with the move into audio signal processing products with the turnover, in 1998, being £14 million. In 2014 it was acquired by Cirrus Logic for $500 million [14].

Collins was noted within the University for his drive and enthusiasm. He helped grow the Department of Electrical Engineering (EE) academic staff from 10 to 25, re-structured student teaching programmes and set the path towards EE at Edinburgh achieving top category research status in the 1996 and 2001 national assessments [15, 16].

The ultimate success of Collins' 1971 vision to establish signal processing at the University of Edinburgh is still in evidence today [17]. Collins' vison has become a 140-person joint research institute in signal and image processing [18], between the University of Edinburgh and Heriot-Watt University, which is the largest signal processing research activity in the UK. In recognition of Collins many research and technical achievements Professor Michael Davies at Edinburgh now holds the "Jeffrey Collins Chair of Signal Processing" [19].

Collins served from 1970 as technical director of Microwave and Electronic Systems (MESL) [20], where he expanded their commercial capabilities into SAW radar pulse compression filters for new radar receiver designs. This success led to the company merging with Racal Electronics in 1979 and achieving a 1989 Queen's Award for Technological Achievement [21].

Collins was involved with Roger Marriott, through the company, Microwave Exhibition and Publishers, where they organised the first in a series of Technical Conference and Trade Exhibition, MICROWAVE 73, at Brighton [22]. The associated Trade Exhibition was subsequently combined with the European Microwave Conference [23]. Here Jeff honed his skills on document word optimisation with Harry Eustace at the conference's US magazine 'Microwave Systems News' [24].

Collins served from 1979 on the Equipment Sub-committee of the University Grants Committee. This nine person Sub-committee had responsibility for, the distribution of Equipment Funds to every UK University; and to assess whether or not Departments were "well found". In 1984 he joined the Computer Board who had executive authority for dispersing £30 million p.a. to Universities for maintaining and enhancing their computer resources for teaching, research and library search.

In 1987, Collins moved to the USA to take up a position as the founding director of the Automation and Robotics Research Institute at the University of Texas at Arlington. Here he developed this new institute securing the necessary funding from the Texas legislature, further demonstrating his technical and management skills.

In 1991 Collins returned to Scotland, where he joined Lothian Regional Council as a consultant on entrepreneurship in their Economic Development Division. He also chaired the University of Edinburgh, Edinburgh Parallel Computing Centre which attracted the UK National Supercomputing Service in 1994, running today using the ARCHER, Blue Gene and HECTOR supercomputers.

Collins assisted Napier University in 1992, when his colleague John Mavor was appointed principal, reorganising of their research and computing infrastructure. Collins then became Chair of the Napier Scottish Electronics Manufacturing Centre securing financial support from Scottish Enterprise before it transformed into the Scottish Advanced Manufacturing Centre in Livingston.

Collins also encouraged and assisted Stephen Salter and Win Rampen to form the Edinburgh digital hydraulics spin-out company Artemis Intelligent Power, who secured the 2015 McRobert Award. Collins served here as an advisor until the company was sold to Mitsubishi in 2010.

== Recognition ==
Collins achieved several distinctions: Fellow of the IEEE; Fellow of the Institute of Physics, Chartered Engineer; Fellow of the Institution of Electrical Engineers, where he served as chair of the Electronics Division Board with a local industrial featured chairman's address [25]. He was elected in 1981 as a Fellow of the Royal Academy of Engineering and in 1983 Fellow of the Royal Society of Edinburgh.
