= Acousto-electronics =

Acousto-electronics (also spelled 'Acoustoelectronics') is a branch of physics, acoustics and electronics that studies interactions of ultrasonic and hypersonic waves in solids with electrons and with electro-magnetic fields. Typical phenomena studied in acousto-electronics are acousto-electric effect and also amplification of acoustic waves by flows of electrons in piezoelectric semiconductors, when the drift velocity of the electrons exceeds the velocity of sound. The term 'acousto-electronics' is often understood in a wider sense to include numerous practical applications of the interactions of electro-magnetic fields with acoustic waves in solids. In particular, these are signal processing devices using surface acoustic waves (SAW), different sensors of temperature, pressure, humidity, acceleration, etc.

== See also ==
- Acousto-optics
- Rayleigh wave
- Love wave
- Interdigital transducer
- Picosecond ultrasonics
