= Rye Studio School =

Location
- The Grove; Rye, East Sussex, TN31 7NQ; England; 50°57′18″N 0°43′55″E

Information
- Type: Studio school
- Established: 2013
- Closed: 2018
- Local authority: East Sussex
- Department for Education URN: 139689 Tables
- Ofsted: Reports
- Chair of Governors: Sue Schlesinger
- Principal
- Gender: Mixed
- Age: 14 to 19
- Enrolment: 126
- Website: http://www.ryestudioschool.co.uk

Rye Studio School was a mixed studio school located in Rye, East Sussex, England. It opened in 2013 and catered for students aged 14–19 years. It was located on the Rye College campus, sponsored by the Rye Academy Trust, and is classified as a free school. It closed in 2018. It was situated on the site of the former Music Department block that was part of Rye College.

== Curriculum ==
As a studio school the curriculum was different from many local secondary schools. The core GCSE subjects of maths, computer science and English language and literature were followed, with the curriculum extended to include performing arts, photography, music, art and creative media to GCSE standard. The school offered mainstream qualifications, using enquiry-based projects, and linked to employment, with local employers involved in all aspects of the curriculum.

== Ofsted ==
In June 2015, the school had its first Ofsted inspection, when the school was judged to be "Outstanding". The inspectors noted that the school had an impressive strategic vision which, only two years after opening, was being fully realised. It was inspected again in October 2016 and judged as Requiring Improvement. The inspectors stated that "The founding leaders of the studio school remain rightly proud of the vision. Regrettably, this impressive ambition was not tempered by a realistic understanding of all the managerial skills necessary to lead successful provision".

== Changes ==
In March 2017, Rye Studio announced it would be taking no new intakes from the age of 14, and would try and re-brand in 2018/19. There were protests from students and the local community. From December 2017, the plan was for the school to merge with Rye College in September 2018.
