= Jeff Collins =

Jeff Collins may refer to:

- Jeff Collins (North Carolina politician) (born 1955), member of the North Carolina General Assembly
- Jeff Collins (Australian politician) (born 1961), member of the Northern Territory Legislative Assembly
- Jeffrey H. Collins (1930–2015), known as Jeff, British electrical engineer
- Jeff Collins (producer), founder of Collins Avenue Productions
- Jeff Collins (New York politician), candidate for New York State Senate
