= Surface acoustic wave sensor =

Microelectromechanical sensor

Surface acoustic wave sensors are a class of microelectromechanical systems (MEMS) which rely on the modulation of surface acoustic waves to sense a physical phenomenon. The sensor transduces an input electrical signal into a mechanical wave which, unlike an electrical signal, can be easily influenced by physical phenomena. The device then transduces this wave back into an electrical signal. Changes in amplitude, phase, frequency, or time delay between the input and output electrical signals can be used to measure the presence of the desired phenomenon.

== Device Layout ==
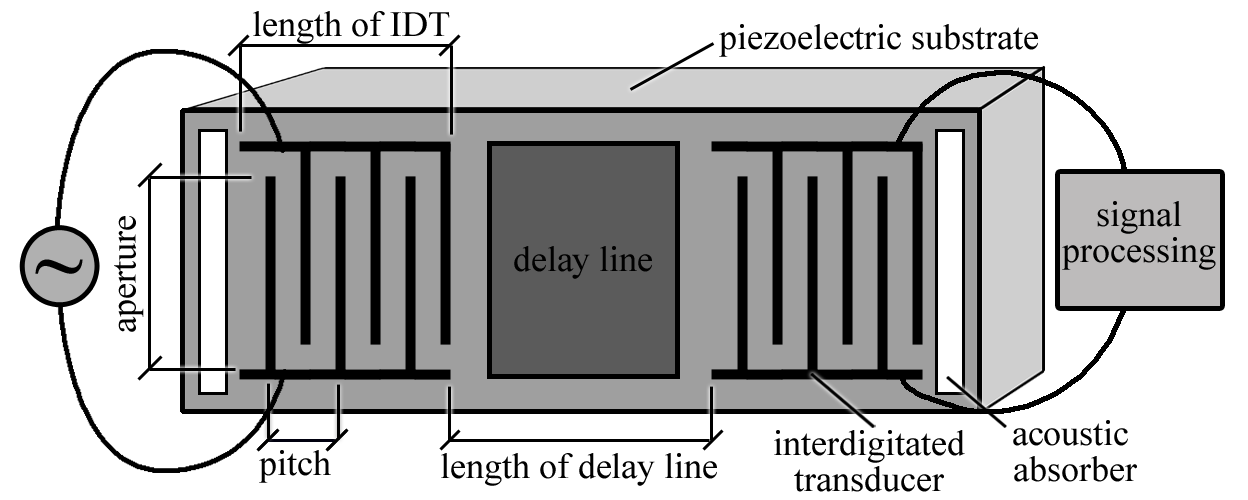
Surface Acoustic Wave Sensor Interdigitated Transducer Diagram

The basic surface acoustic wave device consists of a piezoelectric substrate with an input interdigitated transducer (IDT) on one side of the surface of the substrate, and an output IDT on the other side of the substrate. The space between the IDTs across which the surface acoustic wave propagates is known as the delay line; the signal produced by the input IDT - a physical wave - moves much slower than its associated electromagnetic form, causing a measurable delay.

== Device Operation ==
Surface acoustic wave technology takes advantage of the piezoelectric effect in its operation. Most modern surface acoustic wave sensors use an input interdigitated transducer (IDT) to convert an electrical signal into an acoustic wave.

The sinusoidal electrical input signal creates alternating polarity between the fingers of the interdigitated transducer. Between two adjacent sets of fingers, polarity of the fingers will be switched (e.g. + - +). As a result, the direction of the electric field between two fingers will alternate between adjacent sets of fingers. This creates alternating regions of tensile and compressive strain between fingers of the electrode by the piezoelectric effect, producing a mechanical wave at the surface known as a surface acoustic wave. As fingers on the same side of the device will be at the same level of compression or tension, the space between them---known as the pitch---is the wavelength of the mechanical wave. We can express the synchronous frequency f_{0} of the device with phase velocity v_{p} and pitch p as:

$$f_0 = \frac{v_p}{p}$$

The synchronous frequency is the natural frequency at which mechanical waves should propagate. Ideally, the input electric signal should be at the synchronous frequency to minimize insertion loss.

As the mechanical wave will propagate in both directions from the input IDT, half of the energy of the waveform will propagate across the delay line in the direction of the output IDT. In some devices, a mechanical absorber or reflector is added between the IDTs and the edges of the substrate to prevent interference patterns or reduce insertion losses, respectively.

The acoustic wave travels across the surface of the device substrate to the other interdigitated transducer, converting the wave back into an electric signal by the piezoelectric effect. Any changes that were made to the mechanical wave will be reflected in the output electric signal. As the characteristics of the surface acoustic wave can be modified by changes in the surface properties of the device substrate, sensors can be designed to quantify any phenomenon which alters these properties. Typically, this is accomplished by the addition of mass to the surface or changing the length of the substrate and the spacing between the fingers.

=== Inherent Functionality ===
The structure of the basic surface acoustic wave sensor allows for the phenomena of pressure, strain, torque, temperature, and mass to be sensed. The mechanisms for this are discussed below:

==== Pressure, Strain, Torque, Temperature ====
The phenomena of pressure, strain, torque, temperature, and mass can be sensed by the basic device, consisting of two IDTs separated by some distance on the surface of a piezoelectric substrate. These phenomena can all cause a change in length along the surface of the device. A change in length will affect both the spacing between the interdigitated electrodes---altering the pitch---and the spacing between IDTs---altering the delay. This can be sensed as a phase-shift, frequency-shift, or time-delay in the output electrical signal.

The fundamental measurement of a surface acoustic wave sensor is typically strain. When a diaphragm is placed between the environment at a variable pressure and a reference cavity at a fixed pressure, the diaphragm will bend in response to a pressure differential. As the diaphragm bends, the distance along the surface in compression will increase. A surface acoustic wave pressure sensor either replaces the diaphragm with a piezoelectric substrate patterned with interdigitated electrodes or connects a larger diaphragm to the substrate in order to create a measurable strain in the surface acoustic wave device. When measuring Torque, the principle surface strain of the shaft is in the rotating direction is measured, as application to the sensor will cause a deformation of the piezoelectric substrate. A surface acoustic wave temperature sensor can be fashioned from a piezoelectric substrate with a relatively high coefficient of thermal expansion in the direction of the length of the device. Temperature sensing and strain sensing can be combined into a single device in order to deliver temperature compensation of the sensing system.

Due to the ability of Surface Acoustic Wave sensors to operate within electromagnetically noisy environments and in close proximity to magnets it has been found that they can be embedded into electric motors in order to improve control by providing active torque and temperature measurement of the machine rotor shaft. They have also been applied to robotic control systems in order to provide dynamic torque feedback in robot movement reducing jitter.

==== Mass ====
The accumulation of mass on the surface of an acoustic wave sensor will affect the surface acoustic wave as it travels across the delay line. The velocity v of a wave traveling through a solid is proportional to the square root of product of the Young's modulus E and the density $\scriptstyle \rho$ of the material.

$$v \propto \sqrt{E/\rho}$$

Therefore, the wave velocity will decrease with added mass. This change can be measured by a change in time-delay or phase-shift between input and output signals. Signal attenuation could be measured as well, as the coupling with the additional surface mass will reduce the wave energy. In the case of mass-sensing, as the change in the signal will always be due to an increase in mass from a reference signal of zero additional mass, signal attenuation can be effectively used.

=== Extended Functionality ===
The inherent functionality of a surface acoustic wave sensor can be extended by the deposition of a thin film of material across the delay line which is sensitive to the physical phenomena of interest. If a physical phenomenon causes a change in length or mass in the deposited thin film, the surface acoustic wave will be affected by the mechanisms mentioned above. Some extended functionality examples are listed below:

==== Chemical Vapors ====
Chemical vapor sensors use the application of a thin film polymer across the delay line which selectively absorbs the gas or gases of interest. An array of such sensors with different polymeric coatings can be used to sense a large range of gases on a single sensor with resolution down to parts per trillion, allowing for the creation of a sensitive "lab on a chip."

==== Biological Matter ====
A biologically active layer can be placed between the interdigitated electrodes which contains immobilized antibodies. If the corresponding antigen is present in a sample, the antigen will bind to the antibodies, causing a mass-loading on the device. These sensors can be used to detect bacteria and viruses in samples, as well as to quantify the presence of certain mRNA and proteins.

==== Humidity ====
Surface acoustic wave humidity sensors require a thermoelectric cooler in addition to a surface acoustic wave device. The thermoelectric cooler is placed below the surface acoustic wave device. Both are housed in a cavity with an inlet and outlet for gases. By cooling the device, water vapor will tend to condense on the surface of the device, causing a mass-loading.

==== Ultraviolet Radiation ====
Surface acoustic wave devices are made sensitive to optical wavelengths through the phenomenon known as acoustic charge transport (ACT), which involves the interaction between a surface acoustic wave and photogenerated charge carriers from a photoconducting layer. Ultraviolet radiation sensors use a thin layer of zinc oxide across the delay line. When exposed to ultraviolet radiation, zinc oxide generates charge carriers which interact with the electric fields produced in the piezoelectric substrate by the traveling surface acoustic wave. This interaction produces measurable decreases in both the velocity and amplitude of the acoustic wave signal.

==== Magnetic Fields ====
Ferromagnetic materials (such as iron, nickel, and cobalt) change their physical dimensions in the presence of an applied magnetic field, a property called magnetostriction. The Young's modulus of the material is dependent on ambient magnetic field strength. If a film of magnetostrictive material is deposited in the delay line of a surface acoustic wave sensor, the change in length of the deposited film in response to a change in the magnetic field will stress the underlying substrate. The resulting strain (i.e., the deformation of the surface of the substrate) produces measurable changes in the phase velocity, phase-shift, and time-delay of the acoustic wave signal, providing information about the magnetic field.

==== Viscosity ====
Surface acoustic wave devices can be used to measure changes in viscosity of a liquid placed upon it. As the liquid becomes more viscous the resonant frequency of the device will change in correspondence. A network analyser is needed to view the resonant frequency.

== External links and references ==
- A Fabrication Study of a Surface Acoustic Wave Device for Magnetic Field Detection
- Chemical SAW sensor
- SAW sensor research paper from article author
- Surface Acoustic Wave Torque Measuring Technology
- SAW flow meter
