= Rye College =

Location
- The Grove; Rye, East Sussex, TN31 7NQ; England
- Coordinates: 50°57′18″N 0°43′55″E

Information
- Type: Academy
- Motto: Creating Bright Futures for All
- Religious affiliation: None
- Founder: Sir Thomas Peacocke
- Department for Education URN: 146825 Tables
- Ofsted: Reports
- Headteacher: Dominic Downes
- Gender: Coeducational
- Age: 11 to 16
- Enrolment: 500
- Website: www.ryecollege.co.uk

Rye College, formerly Thomas Peacocke Community College and Rye Grammar School, is a coeducational secondary school with academy status, located in Rye, East Sussex, England.

== History ==
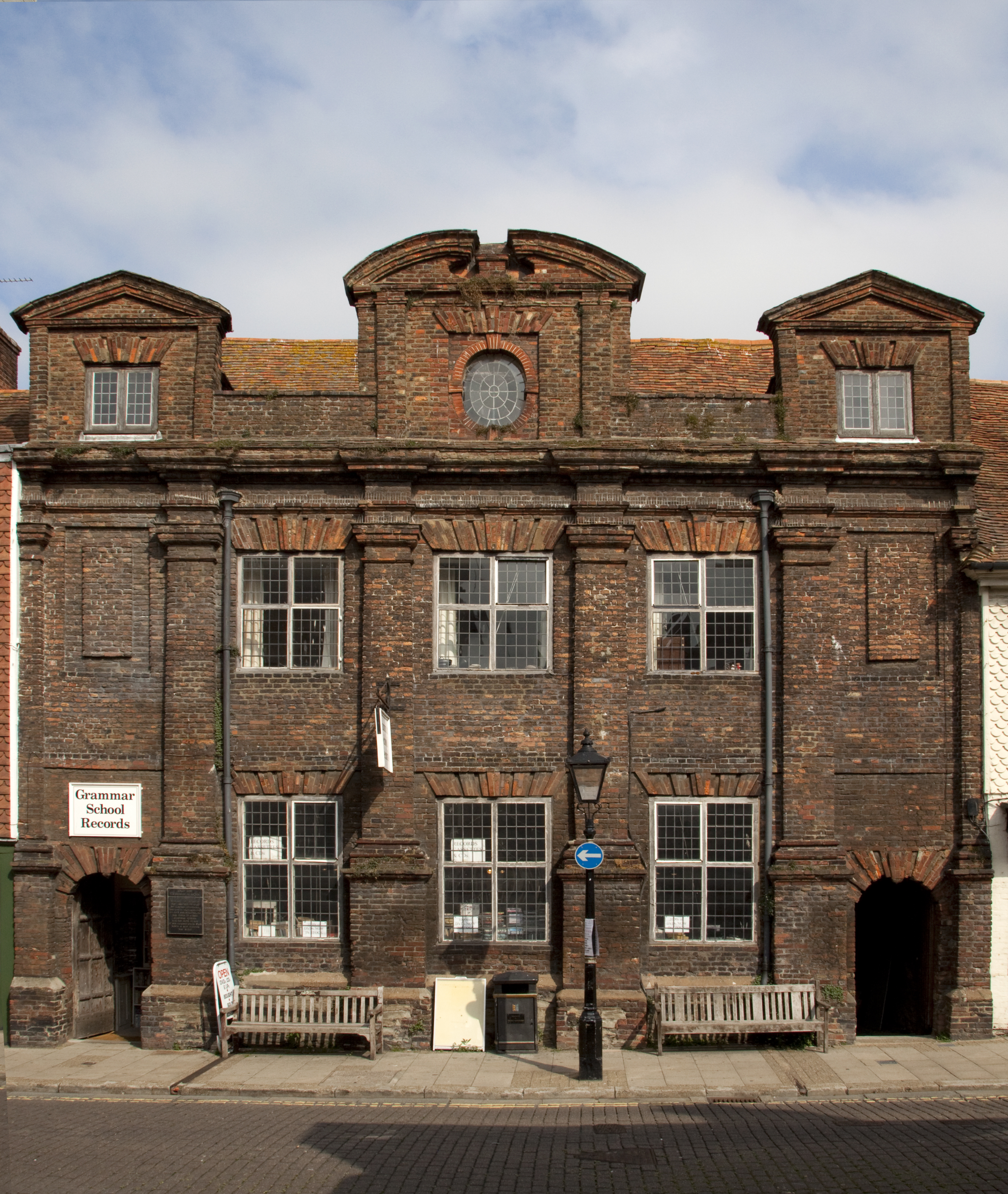
The Old Rye Grammar School

The school developed from earlier schools in Rye such as Rye Grammar School which was founded by Sir Thomas Peacocke in 1636. It became a comprehensive school in (or before) 1969.

In November 2018 Rye College joined the Aquinas Church of England Education Trust, whilst retaining its community school terms of reference. It is a non-faith school.

== Ofsted judgement and academic performance ==
The school was judged Good by Ofsted in 2023. Performance at GCSE in 2017 was average compared to national results, based on the Progress 8 measure.

== Notable former pupils ==
Of Thomas Peacocke Community College:

- Simon Nelson, 10th Earl Nelson
- Mark Edwards, best-selling fiction writer
- James McCartney, musician and songwriter
- Mary McCartney, photographer and vegetarian cookery writer
- Stella McCartney, fashion designer

Of Rye Grammar School:

- Prof Percival Allen, Professor of Geology from 1952–1982 at the University of Reading, and President from 1978–1980 of the Geological Society of London
- Prof Ted Paige, expert on surface acoustic waves at the Royal Radar Establishment from 1955–1977, and Professor of Electrical Engineering from 1977–1997 at the University of Oxford. His research had great use for airborne radar used by the RAF from the 1970s.
- Harry Peulevé DSO MC
- Mark Saville, Baron Saville of Newdigate, chaired the Bloody Sunday Inquiry
