= Mark Edwards (British writer) =

English author (born 1970)

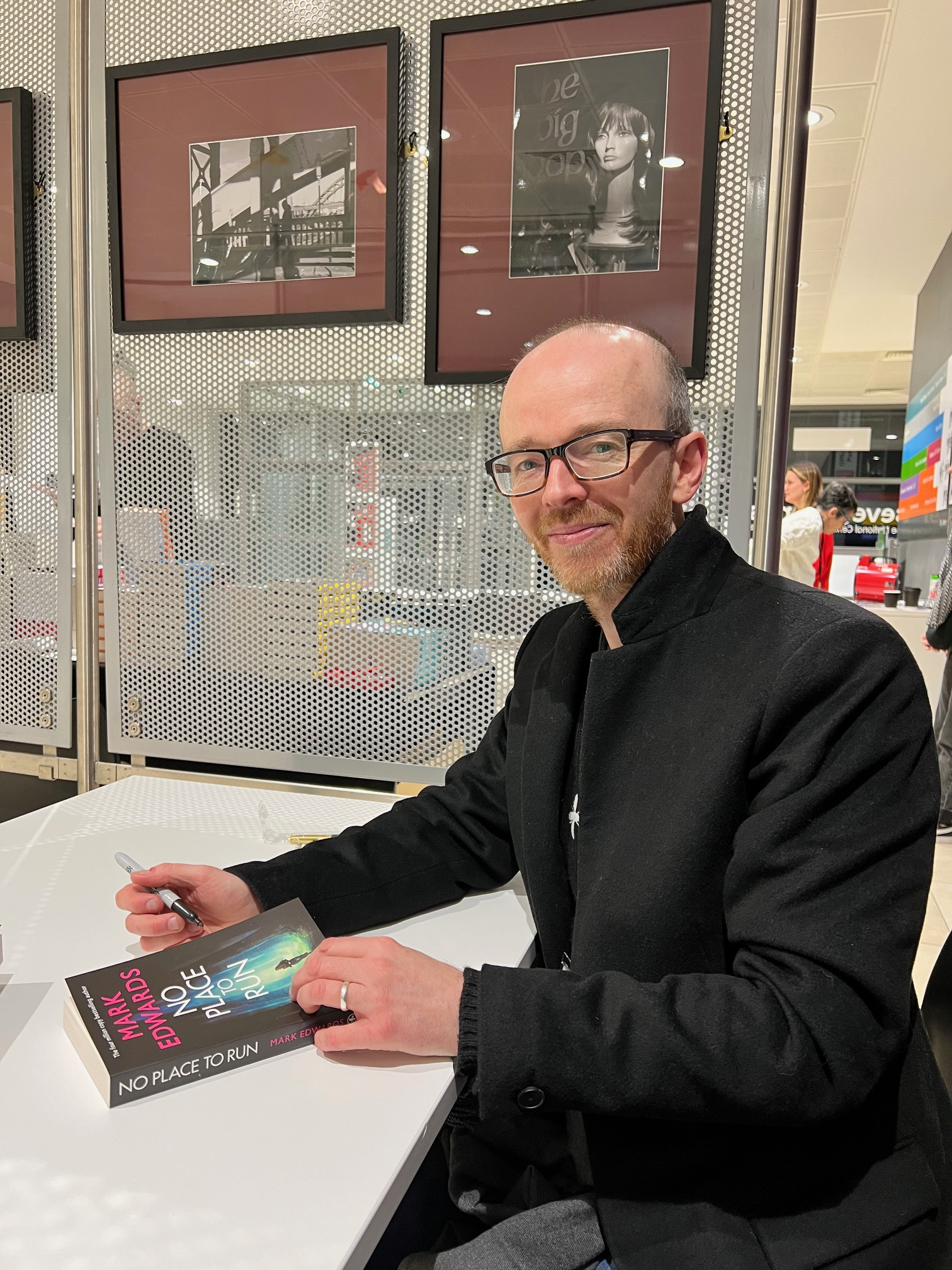
- Edwards in 2022
- Born: 1970 (age 55–56); Kent, England
- Occupation: Writer
- Writing career
- Language: English
- Genre: thriller
- Website: markedwardsauthor.com

Mark Edwards (born 1970) is an English novelist based in London. His books have sold over four million copies and been translated into 12 languages. Edwards writes primarily thrillers. His 2013 solo debut, The Magpies, and his 2022 novel, No Place to Run, were top ten Kindle bestsellers. He has co-authored six books with Louise Voss.

== Early life ==
Edwards was born in Kent, England, on 4 November 1970. He grew up in Hastings, East Sussex, where he attended Rye College. He graduated from Staffordshire University in 1993, with a degree in sociology. While pursuing a career as a writer, Edwards worked for the civil service and did customer service for a rail franchise and eventually a London-based book publisher. He also had a stint as an English teacher in Tokyo, Japan, while pursuing his first publishing deal.

== Career ==
In 1999, Edwards appeared in the BBC documentary Close Up: First Writes, which followed three writers at the start of their careers.

In 2011, he self-published two novels co-authored with Louise Voss, Killing Cupid and Catch Your Death, through Kindle Direct Publishing. This led to a four-book deal with HarperCollins. In 2013, Edwards published his debut solo novel, The Magpies, which was a number-one bestseller and led to a deal with Thomas & Mercer.

His 2019 novel Here to Stay received positive reviews, including one from critic Natasha Cooper, who wrote: "Mark Edwards has sold millions of copies of his domestic suspense novels. On the evidence of Here to Stay, his latest, it is not hard to see why."

In 2024, Penguin Michael Joseph bought Edwards' thriller The Wasp Trap, the author's first solo traditional publishing deal.

== Influences ==
Edwards has said he is a fan of the American horror writer Stephen King, who has shaped the kind of stories he likes to tell, where "extraordinary, often scary, things [happen] to ordinary people". The works of both Harlan Coben and Linwood Barclay influenced Edwards when he wrote No Place to Run. He has also cited Michael Connelly as an inspiration.

== Personal life ==
Edwards lives in Wolverhampton with his wife and their children.

== Novels ==
with Louise Voss

- Killing Cupid (2012)
- Catch Your Death (Kate Maddox #1) (2012)
- All Fall Down (Kate Maddox #2) (2012)
- Forward Slash (2013)
- From the Cradle (Detective Patrick Lennon #1) (2014)
- The Blissfully Dead (Detective Patrick Lennon #2) (2015)

Solo

- The Magpies (The Magpies #1) (2013)
- What You Wish For (2014)
- Because She Loves Me (2014)
- Follow You Home (2015)
- The Devil's Work (2016)
- The Lucky Ones (2017)
- A Murder of Magpies (The Magpies #2) (2018)
- The Retreat (2018)
- In Her Shadow (2018)
- Last of the Magpies (The Magpies #3) (2019)
- Here to Stay (2019)
- The House Guest (2020)
- The Hollows (2021)
- No Place to Run (2022)
- Keep Her Secret (2023)
- The Darkest Water (2024)
- The Psychopath Next Door (2025)
- The Wasp Trap (2025)
- One of the Family (2026)
