= Richard S. Muller =

American microelectromechanical researcher

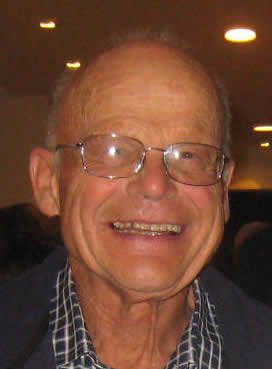
- Born: Richard Stephen Muller; May 5, 1933 (age 93)

Academic background
- Education: Stevens Institute of Technology California Institute of Technology

Academic work
- Institutions: University of California at Berkeley
- Notable students: Roger T. Howe

Richard Stephen Muller (born May 5, 1933) is an American professor in the Electrical Engineering and Computer Science Department of the University of California at Berkeley.

He made contributions to the founding and growth of the field of MicroElectromechanical Systems (MEMS). Together with student, Roger T. Howe, he made the initial seminal contribution of polysilicon sacrificially-released beams in 1982. This led to a class of micromanufacturing processes called surface micromachining. These processes preceded the creation of low cost, mass-produced commercial micro accelerometers, which are used in automotive collision sensors for airbag deployment. Together with Richard M. White, he created BSAC (Berkeley Sensor & Actuator Center), an organization that produced many generations of academic researchers and intellectual properties in the MEMS field. MEMS is an activity that in 2013 accounted for multi-billion dollar revenue worldwide.

Muller was elected a member of the US National Academy of Engineering in 1992 for contributions to the technology and design of integrated electronic sensors.

== Biography ==
Muller received the degree of Mechanical Engineer (with highest honors) from the Stevens Institute of Technology, Hoboken, New Jersey, 1955; and his M.S. in Electrical Engineering and Ph.D. in Electrical Engineering and Physics, in 1957 and 1962, respectively, at the California Institute of Technology, in Pasadena, California. From 1955 to 1962 he was a member of the technical staff at the Hughes Aircraft Company in Culver City, California. In 1962, he joined the Electrical Engineering faculty at UC Berkeley. From 1995 to 2005, Muller served as a Trustee of the Stevens Institute of Technology.

== Scientific work ==
His initial research and teaching on the physics of integrated-circuit devices led to collaboration with Theodore I. Kamins of Hewlett-Packard Laboratories in writing Device Electronics for Integrated Circuits, first published by John Wiley & Sons in 1977, with a second edition in 1986, and a third edition appearing in 2002. Muller changed his research focus in the late 1970s to the general area now known as microelectromechanical systems (MEMS), and he joined in 1986 with colleague Richard M. White to found the Berkeley Sensor & Actuator Center (BSAC), an NSF/Industry/University Cooperative Research Center. In 1990, he proposed to IEEE and ASME the creation of a MEMS technical journal, which began publication in 1991 as the IEEE/ASME Journal of Microelectromechanical Systems (IEEE/ASME JMEMS). In 1997, Muller was chosen Editor-Chief of JMEMS and served in this position until 2013. Muller and his student Roger T. Howe created the process of surface micromachining using polysilicon (poly) as a structural material, and silicon oxide as a sacrificial layer. This surface micromachining process becomes the foundation of high volume airbag accelerometers. The surface micromachining process is the fundamental process for many consumer, industrial, and military devices today, including microphones, pressure sensors, electronic filters, spectrometers, and e-readers.

Muller has received the following academic awards and recognition: the UC Berkeley Citation (1994); the Stevens Institute of Technology Renaissance Award (1995); the Transducers Research Conference Career Achievement Award (1997), the IEEE Cledo Brunetti Award (with Roger T. Howe, 1998), an IEEE Millennium Medal (2000), and IEEE/RSE Wolfson James Clerk Maxwell Award (2013). He is a member of the National Academy of Engineering, and a Life Fellow of the IEEE.

== Lectures ==
- 1992 - Formidable partners: microelectronics and micromechanics Lecture sponsored by the Dept. of Electrical and Computer engineering, University of California, San Diego. Electrical and Computer Engineering Distinguished Lecture Series. Digital object made available by UC San Diego Library.
