= Vasundara Varadan =

Vasundra V. Varadan
- Education: University of Kerala; University of Illinois at Chicago
- Scientific career
- Workplaces: Ohio State University; University of Arkansas; Pennsylvania State University

Vasundara Venkatraman Varadan is a professor emeritus at University of Arkansas and a Fellow of SPIE. Her research considerers microwave sensors and new materials for solar panels. She served on the faculty at Pennsylvania State University for 22 years.

== Early life and education ==
Varadan studied physics at the University of Kerala and earned her bachelor's degree in 1967. Her sisters studied physics and business. She remained there for her graduate studies and completed her master's degree in 1969. She moved to the University of Illinois for her doctorate, which she defended in 1974.

== Research and career ==
In 1974 Varadan joined Cornell University, where she worked on wave propagation and materials science. She moved to Ohio State University in 1977 where she was an associate professor in wave physics and composite materials. She served on the faculty at Pennsylvania State University for over twenty years, working as co-director of the Centre for Electronic Engineering. She was promoted to professor in 1986. In 2002 Varadan was made National Science Foundation Division Director of Electrical & Communications Systems. She moved to the University of Arkansas in 2005, where she served as the Billingsley Chair and distinguished professor.

Varadan's research considered microwaves, wireless sensors and sonar materials. She developed surface acoustic wave sensor to monitor the health of bridges and highways. The sensors can detect flooding, dangerous levels of traffic, cracks and ice formation. They contain microwave antennas and piezoelectric transducers which can convert sound waves into microwaves. The sensors can be mounted at both ends of a bridge, as the propagating sound waves travelling across the bridge would be impacted by any strain on the structure. Varadan established Microwave Measurement Systems, which designs free-space systems for microwave characterisation of materials. The measurements are non-destructive and contactless, and can be operated at high and low temperature. She also worked on new materials for solar panels.

=== Outreach and engagement ===
Varadan has been involved with several activities to improve access to science and engineering. She created the Ms. Wiz program, which was one of the first interventions that attracted young girls to science and engineering careers. She served as the chair of the Pennsylvania State University Committee for Women. In 1995 she was selected as an ambassador at the Workshop on Women's Issues in Beijing. She developed a solar powered travelling laboratory, the GREEN mobile, which travelled Arkansas providing hands-on science opportunities for elementary school children. The activities relate to sustainable energy and are linked to the Arkansas K-12 School Curriculum.

=== Selected publications ===
Her publications include the following:

- Ghodgaonkar, Deepak K.; Varadan, Vasundra V.; Varadan, Vijay K. (June 1989). "A free-space method for measurement of dielectric constants and loss tangents at microwave frequencies". IEEE Transactions on Instrumentation and Measurement. 38 (3): 789–793. Bibcode:1989ITIM...38..789G. doi:10.1109/19.32194.
- Lakhtakia, Akhlesh; Varadan, Vijay K.; Varadan, Vasundara V. (1989). Time-Harmonic Electromagnetic Fields in Chiral Media. Springer. ISBN 978-0-38751-317-1. OCLC 423299987.
- Sayan Seal; Vinay Budhraja; Liming Ji; Vasundara V. Varadan (2015). "Enhanced Light Trapping in Thin Film Solar Cells Using a Plasmonic Fishnet Structure". International Journal of Photoenergy. 2015: 1–8. doi:10.1155/2015/910619. ISSN 1110-662X. Wikidata Q59110440.
