= Amit Lal =

American electrical engineering professor

- Education: University of California Berkeley, Caltech
- Scientific career
- Fields: Electrical Engineering, M/NEMS, Ultrasonic
- Workplaces: Cornell University, SonicMEMS
- Doctoral advisor: Richard M. White

Amit Lal is an American academic, a Robert M. Scharf 1977 Professor of Engineering at the Electrical and Computer Engineering Department at Cornell University and director of SonicMEMS Laboratory.

He earned a B.S. in electrical engineering from CalTech and a Ph.D. in electrical engineering from the University of California, Berkeley. His doctoral research at the Berkeley Sensors and Actuators Center focused on ultrasonic MEMS. He served as a program manager at DARPA in the Microsystems Technology Office, from 2005 to 2009. At DARPA he managed ten and started six new programs in the area of navigation, low-energy computation, bio-robotics, and atomic microsystems. Before joining the Cornell faculty, he was an assistant professor at the University of Wisconsin, Madison. He holds over 30 patents.
