= Acousto-electric effect =

Acousto-electric effect is a nonlinear phenomenon of generation of electric current in a piezo-electric semiconductor by a propagating acoustic wave. The generated electric current is proportional to the intensity of the acoustic wave and to the value of its electron-induced attenuation. The effect was theoretically predicted in 1953 by Parmenter. Its first experimental observation were reported in 1957 by Weinreich and White.

== Valley acoustoelectric effect ==
There are two varieties of the original acousto-electric effect called the valley acoustoelectric effect and valley acoustoelectric Hall effect theoretically predicted in 2019 by Kalameitsev, Kovalev, and Savenko. These effects also represent nonlinear phenomena of generation of electric current in two-dimensional materials, such as transition metal dichalcogenide monolayers or graphene, located on a piezoelectric substrate by a propagating acoustic wave. The generated electric currents are proportional to the intensity of the acoustic wave and their directions are perpendicular to the acoustic wave vector.

== See also ==
- Physical acoustics
- Semiconductors
- Piezoelectricity
- Elastic waves
