= Oscillator phase noise =

Electronic noise

An Oscillator exhibit phase noise, which refers to fluctuations in the phase of the output signal, causing deviations from perfect periodicity. Phase noise is an additive process, concentrated near the oscillation frequency and its harmonics. This noise manifests as sidebands around the carrier frequency. Due to the spectral proximity of phase noise to the carrier, conventional filtering techniques cannot effectively remove it without also attenuating the desired signal.

In nonlinear oscillators, well-designed systems typically exhibit a stable limit cycle, meaning that when perturbed, the oscillator returns to a periodic state, but the exact phase of the oscillation has an inherent phase randomness. The lack of reference timing leads to phase fluctuations, as nonlinear oscillators are autonomous systems, and do not rely on an external timing reference, disturbances predominantly manifest as phase rather than frequency noise.

== Oscillator voltage noise and phase-noise spectra ==
There are two different ways commonly used to characterize noise in an oscillator. S_{φ} is the spectral density of the phase and S_{v} is the spectral density of the voltage. S_{v} contains both amplitude and phase components, but with oscillators the phase noise dominates except at frequencies far from the carrier and its harmonics. S_{v} is directly observable on a spectrum analyzer, whereas S_{φ} is only observable if the signal is first passed through a phase detector. Another measure of oscillator noise is L, which is simply S_{v} normalized to the power in the fundamental.

As t → ∞ the phase of the oscillator drifts without bound, and so S_{φ}(Δf) → ∞ as Δf → 0. However, even as the phase drifts without bound, the excursion in the voltage is limited by the diameter of the limit cycle of the oscillator. Therefore, as Δf → 0 the PSD of v flattens out, as shown in Figure 3(removed due to unknown copyright status). The more phase noise, broader the linewidth (the higher the corner frequency), and the lower signal amplitude within the linewidth. This happens because the phase noise does not affect the total power in the signal, it only affects its distribution. Without noise, S_{v}(f) is a series of impulse functions at the harmonics of the oscillation frequency. With noise, the impulse functions spread, becoming fatter and shorter but retaining the same total power.

The voltage noise S_{v} is considered to be a small signal outside the linewidth and thus can be accurately predicted using small-signal analyses. Conversely, the voltage noise within the linewidth is a large signal (it is large enough to cause the circuit to behave nonlinearly) and cannot be predicted with small-signal analyses. Thus, small-signal noise analysis, such as is available from RF simulators, is valid only up to the corner frequency (it does not model the corner itself).

== Oscillators and frequency correlation ==
With driven cyclostationary systems that have a stable time reference, the correlation in frequency is a series of impulse functions separated by f_{o} = 1/T. Thus, noise at f_{1} is correlated with f_{2} if f_{2} = f_{1} + kf_{o}, where k is an integer, and not otherwise. However, the phase produced by oscillators that exhibit phase noise is not stable. And while the noise produced by oscillators is correlated across frequency, the correlation is not a set of equally spaced impulses as it is with driven systems. Instead, the correlation is a set of smeared impulses. That is, noise at f_{1} is correlated with f_{2} if f_{2} = f_{1} + kf_{o}, where k is close to being an integer.

Technically, the noise produced by oscillators is not cyclostationary. This distinction only becomes significant when the output of an oscillator is compared to its own output from the distant past. This might occur, for example, in a radar system where the current output of an oscillator might be mixed with the previous output after it was delayed by traveling to and from a distant object. It occurs because the phase of the oscillator has drifted randomly during the time-of-flight. If the time-of-flight is long enough, the phase difference between the two becomes completely randomized and the two signals can be treated as if they are non-synchronous. Thus, the noise in the return signal can be taken as being stationary because it is 'non-synchronous' with the LO, even though the return signal and the LO are derived from the same oscillator. If the time-of-flight is very short, then there is no time for the phase difference between the two to become randomized and the noise is treated as if it is simply cyclostationary. Finally, if the time-of-flight significant but less than the time it takes the oscillator’s phase to become completely randomized, then the phase is only partially randomized. In this case, one must be careful to take into account the smearing in the correlation spectrum that occurs with oscillators.
