= Roger T. Howe =

American electrical engineer

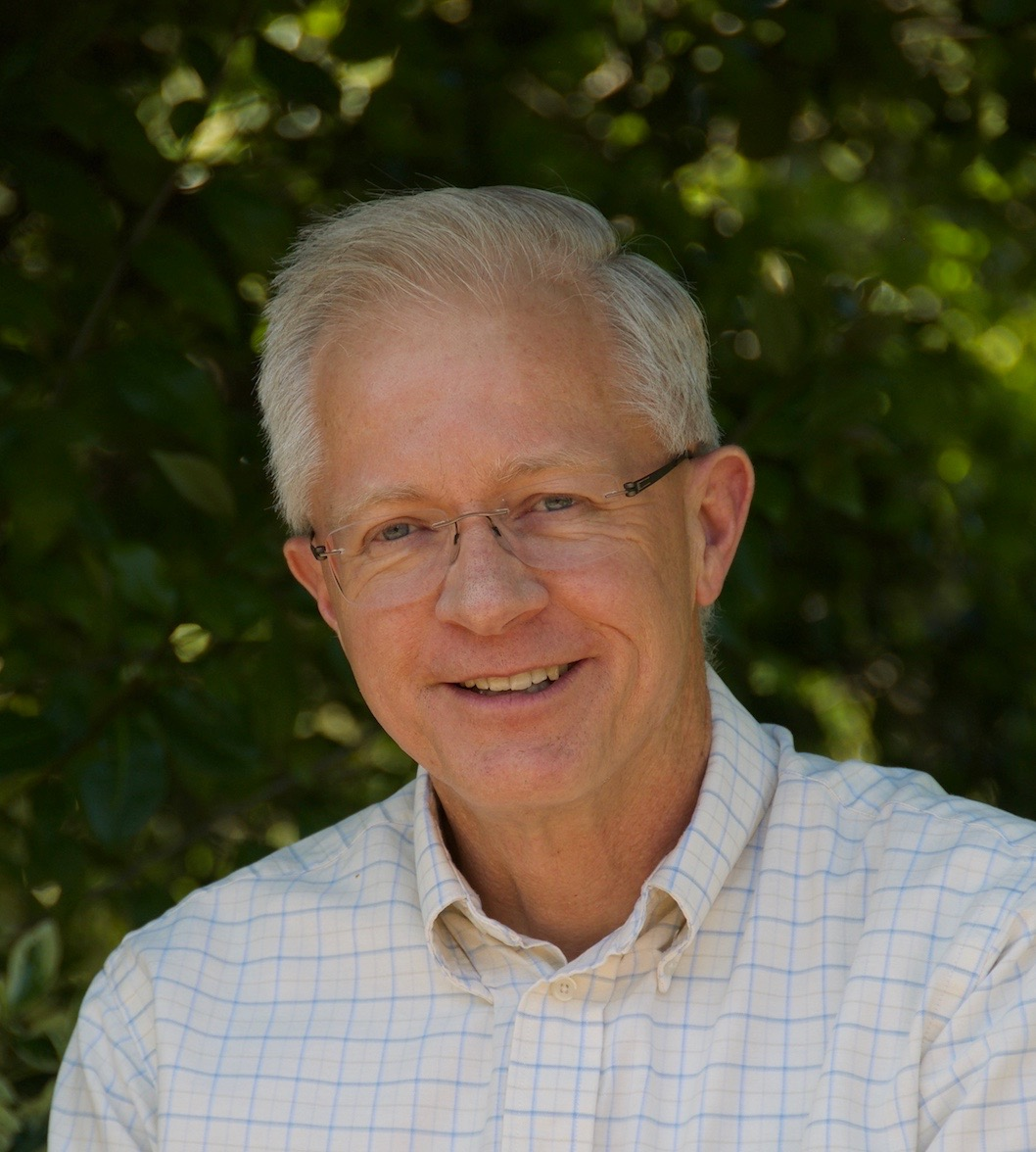
- Born: 1957 (age 68–69); Sacramento, California, U.S.
- Education: Harvey Mudd College; University of California, Berkeley
- Known for: MEMS; nanoscale devices; fabrication technology
- Awards: National Academy of Engineering member
- Scientific career
- Fields: Electrical Engineering
- Workplaces: Stanford University
- Thesis: Integrated Electromechanical Vapor Sensor, 1984
- Doctoral advisor: Richard S. Muller (UC Berkeley)

Roger Thomas Howe (born 1957 in Sacramento, California) is the William E. Ayer Professor of Electrical Engineering at Stanford University. He earned a B.S. degree in physics from Harvey Mudd College (Claremont, California) and M.S. and Ph.D. degrees in electrical engineering from the University of California, Berkeley in 1981 and 1984, respectively. He was a faculty member at Carnegie-Mellon University from 1984 to 1985, at the Massachusetts Institute of Technology from 1985 to 1987, and at UC Berkeley between 1987 and 2005, where he was the Robert S. Pepper Distinguished Professor. He has been a faculty member of the School of Engineering at Stanford since 2005.

His research interests are micro and nanoelectromechanical systems (M/NEMS) design and fabrication. He and his Ph.D. advisor, Richard S. Muller at Berkeley, developed polysilicon surface micromachining technology. This process opened the possibilities of micro mechanical elements such as cantilevers, resonators, and gears. It is currently used for the production of billions of inertial sensors , microphones , and timing devices. Polysilicon micromachining technology is still being developed to achieve higher performance sensors . Together with his Ph.D. student, William C. Tang, he co-invented the electrostatic comb drive, which is a key building block for microsensors and actuators. With his former colleague Tsu-Jae King Liu and their students, a low-temperature polycrystalline silicon germanium micromachining technology was developed that could be fabricated after standard CMOS electronics. Since joining Stanford, he has contributed to thermionic energy conversion devices and broad-spectrum electronic biomolecular sensors.

He was elected an IEEE Fellow in 1996, for "seminal contributions to microfabrication technologies, devices, and micro-electromechanical systems.” He was co-recipient, with Richard S. Muller, of the 1998 IEEE Cledo Brunetti Award. In 2005, he was elected to the U.S. National Academy of Engineering: "for contributions to the development of microelectromechanical systems in processes, devices and systems." In 2015, he and Yu-Chong Tai were co-recipients of the IEEE Electron Devices Society’s Robert Bosch Micro and Nano Electro Mechanical Systems Award. In 2015, he was also the recipient of the IEEE Electron Devices Society Education Award, “for contributions to mentoring and education in the fields of microelectromechanical systems and nanotechnology.” He co-authored the electronics textbook Microelectronics: an Integrated Approach with Charles G. Sodini of MIT.

From 2011 - 2015, he was the director of the U.S. National Nanotechnology Infrastructure Network (NNIN) and from 2009 – 2017, he served as the faculty director of the Stanford Nanofabrication Facility (SNF).

He co-founded two companies based on research in his group. Silicon Clocks, Inc. was founded in 2004 and was acquired by Silicon Labs, Inc. in 2010. ProbiusDx, Inc. was founded in December 2015 to commercialize a broad-spectrum electronic biomolecular sensor.
