= List of piezoelectric materials =

This page lists properties of several commonly used piezoelectric materials.

Piezoelectric materials (PMs) can be broadly classified as either crystalline, ceramic, or polymeric. The most commonly produced piezoelectric ceramics are lead zirconate titanate (PZT), barium titanate, and lead titanate. Gallium nitride and zinc oxide can also be regarded as a ceramic due to their relatively wide band gaps. Semiconducting PMs offer features such as compatibility with integrated circuits and semiconductor devices. Inorganic ceramic PMs offer advantages over single crystals, including ease of fabrication into a variety of shapes and sizes not constrained crystallographic directions. Organic polymer PMs, such as PVDF, have low Young's modulus compared to inorganic PMs. Piezoelectric polymers (PVDF, 240 mV-m/N) possess higher piezoelectric stress constants (g_{33}), an important parameter in sensors, than ceramics (PZT, 11 mV-m/N), which show that they can be better sensors than ceramics. Moreover, piezoelectric polymeric sensors and actuators, due to their processing flexibility, can be readily manufactured into large areas, and cut into a variety of shapes. In addition polymers also exhibit high strength, high impact resistance, low dielectric constant, low elastic stiffness, and low density, thereby a high voltage sensitivity which is a desirable characteristic along with low acoustic and mechanical impedance useful for medical and underwater applications.

Among PMs, PZT ceramics are popular as they have a high sensitivity, a high g_{33} value. They are however brittle. Furthermore, they show low Curie temperature, leading to constraints in terms of applications in harsh environmental conditions. However, promising is the integration of ceramic disks into industrial appliances moulded from plastic. This resulted in the development of PZT-polymer composites, and the feasible integration of functional PM composites on large scale, by simple thermal welding or by conforming processes. Several approaches towards lead-free ceramic PM have been reported, such as piezoelectric single crystals (langasite), and ferroelectric ceramics with a perovskite structure and bismuth layer-structured ferroelectrics (BLSF), which have been extensively researched. Also, several ferroelectrics with perovskite-structure (BaTiO_{3} [BT], (Bi_{1/2}Na_{1/2}) TiO_{3} [BNT], (Bi_{1/2}K_{1/2}) TiO_{3} [BKT], KNbO_{3} [KN], (K, Na) NbO_{3} [KNN]) have been investigated for their piezoelectric properties.

== Key piezoelectric properties ==
The following table lists the following properties for piezoelectric materials

- The piezoelectric coefficients (d_{33}, d_{31}, d_{15} etc.) measure the strain induced by an applied voltage (expressed as meters per volt). High d_{ij} coefficients indicate larger displacements which are needed for motoring transducer devices. The coefficient d_{33} measures deformation in the same direction (polarization axis) as the induced potential, whereas d_{31} describes the response when the force is applied perpendicular to the polarization axis. The d_{15} coefficient measures the response when the applied mechanical stress is due to shear deformation.
- Relative permittivity (ε_{r}) is the ratio between the absolute permittivity of the piezoelectric material, ε, and the vacuum permittivity, ε_{0}.
- The electromechanical coupling factor k is an indicator of the effectiveness with which a piezoelectric material converts electrical energy into mechanical energy, or converts mechanical energy into electrical energy. The first subscript to k denotes the direction along which the electrodes are applied; the second denotes the direction along which the mechanical energy is applied, or developed.
- The mechanical quality factor Q_{m} is an important high-power property of piezoelectric ceramics. It is the inverse of the mechanical loss tan Φ.

== Table ==
Single crystals
Reference	Material & heterostructure used for the characterization (electrodes/material, electrode/substrate)	Orientation	Piezoelectric coefficients, d (pC/N)	Relative permittivity, ε_{r}	Electromechanical coupling factor, k	Quality factor
Hutson 1963	AlN		d_{15} = -4.07per	ε_{33} = 11.4		
Hutson 1963	AlN		d_{31} = -2			
Hutson 1963	AlN		d_{33} = 5			
Cook et al. 1963	BaTiO_{3}		d_{15} = 392	ε_{11} = 2920	k_{15} = 0.57	
Cook et al. 1963	BaTiO_{3}		d_{31} = -34.5	ε_{33} = 168	k_{31} = 0.315	
Cook et al. 1963	BaTiO_{3}		d_{33} = 85.6		k_{33} = 0.56	
Warner et al. 1967	LiNbO_{3} (Au-Au)	<001>	d_{15} = 68	ε_{11} = 84		
Warner et al. 1967	LiNbO_{3} (Au-Au)	<001>	d_{22} = 21	ε_{33} = 30		
Warner et al. 1967	LiNbO_{3} (Au-Au)	<001>	d_{31} = -1		k_{31} = 0.02	
Warner et al. 1967	LiNbO_{3} (Au-Au)	<001>	d_{33} = 6		k_{t} = 0.17	
Smith et al. 1971	LiNbO_{3}	<001>	d_{15} = 69.2	ε_{11} = 85.2		
Smith et al. 1971	LiNbO_{3}	<001>	d_{22} = 20.8	ε_{33} = 28.2		
Smith et al. 1971	LiNbO_{3}	<001>	d_{31} = -0.85			
Smith et al. 1971	LiNbO_{3}	<001>	d_{33} = 6			
Yamada et al. 1967	LiNbO_{3} (Au-Au)	<001>	d_{15} = 74	ε_{11} = 84.6		
Yamada et al. 1967	LiNbO_{3} (Au-Au)	<001>	d_{22} = 21	ε_{33} = 28.6	k_{22} = 0.32	
Yamada et al. 1967	LiNbO_{3} (Au-Au)	<001>	d_{31} = -0.87		k_{31} = 0.023	
Yamada et al. 1967	LiNbO_{3} (Au-Au)	<001>	d_{33} = 16		k_{33} = 0.47	
Yamada et al. 1969	LiTaO_{3}		d_{15} = 26	ε_{11} = 53		
Yamada et al. 1969	LiTaO_{3}		d_{22} = 8.5	ε_{33} = 44		
Yamada et al. 1969	LiTaO_{3}		d_{31} = -3			
Yamada et al. 1969	LiTaO_{3}		d_{33} = 9.2			
Cao et al. 2002	PMN-PT (33%)		d_{15} = 146	ε_{11} = 1660	k_{15} = 0.32	
Cao et al. 2002	PMN-PT (33%)		d_{31} = -1330	ε_{33} = 8200	k_{31} = 0.59	
Cao et al. 2002	PMN-PT (33%)		d_{33} = 2820		k_{33} = 0.94	
Cao et al. 2002	PMN-PT (33%)				k_{t} = 0.64	
Badel et al. 2006	PMN-25PT	<110>	d_{31} = -643	ε_{33} = 2560	k_{31} = -0.73	362
Kobiakov 1980	ZnO		d_{15} = -8.3	ε_{11} = 8.67	k_{15} = 0.199	
Kobiakov 1980	ZnO		d_{31} = -5.12	ε_{33} = 11.26	k_{31} = 0.181	
Kobiakov 1980	ZnO		d_{33} = 12.3		k_{33} = 0.466	
Zgonik et al. 1994	ZnO (pure with lithium dopant)		d_{15} = -13.3		k_{r} = 8.2	
Zgonik et al. 1994	ZnO (pure with lithium dopant)		d_{31} = -4.67			
Zgonik et al. 1994	ZnO (pure with lithium dopant)		d_{33} = 12.0			
Zgonik et al. 1994	BaTiO_{3} single crystals	[001] (single domain)	d_{33} = 90			
Zgonik et al. 1994	BaTiO_{3} single crystals	[111] (single domain)	d_{33} = 224			
Zgonik et al. 1994	BaTiO_{3} single crystals	[111] neutral (domain size of 100 ľm)	d_{33} = 235	ε_{33} = 1984	k_{33} = 54.4	
Zgonik et al. 1994	BaTiO_{3} single crystals	[111] neutral (domain size of 60 ľm)	d_{33} = 241	ε_{33} = 1959	k_{33} = 55.9	
Zgonik et al. 1994	BaTiO_{3} single crystals	[111] (domain size of 22 ľm)	d_{33} = 256	ε_{33} = 2008	k_{33} = 64.7	
Zgonik et al. 1994	BaTiO_{3} single crystals	[111] neutral (domain size of 15 ľm)	d_{33} = 274	ε_{33} = 2853	k_{33} = 66.1	
Zgonik et al. 1994	BaTiO_{3} single crystals	[111] neutral (domain size of 14 ľm)	d_{33} = 289	ε_{33} = 1962	k_{33} = 66.7	
Zgonik et al. 1994	BaTiO_{3} single crystals	[111] neutral	d_{33} = 331	ε_{33} = 2679	k_{33} = 65.2	
	LN crystal		d_{31} = -4.5 d_{33} = -0.27			
Li et al. 2010	PMNT31		d_{33} = 2000	ε_{33} = 5100	k_{31} = 80	
Li et al. 2010	PMNT31		d_{31} = -750			
Zhang et al. 2002	PMNT31-A		1400	ε_{33} = 3600		
Zhang et al. 2002	PMNT31-B		1500	ε_{33} = 4800		
Zhang et al. 2002	PZNT4.5		d_{33} = 2100	ε_{33} = 4400	k_{31} = 83	
Zhang et al. 2002	PZNT4.5		d_{31} = -900			
Zhang et al. 2004	PZNT8		d_{33} = 2500	ε_{33} = 6000	k_{31} = 89	
Zhang et al. 2004	PZNT8		d_{31} = -1300			
Zhang et al. 2004	PZNT12		d_{33} = 576	ε_{33} = 870	k_{31} = 52	
Zhang et al. 2004	PZNT12		d_{31} = -217			
Yamashita et al. 1997	PSNT33			ε_{33} = 960	/	
Yasuda et al. 2001	PINT28		700	ε_{33} = 1500	/	
Guo et al. 2003	PINT34		2000	ε_{33} = 5000	/	
Hosono et al. 2003	PIMNT		1950	ε_{33} = 3630	/	
Zhang et al. 2002	PYNT40		d_{33} = 1200	ε_{33} = 2700	k_{31} = 76	
Zhang et al. 2002	PYNT40		d_{31} = -500			
Zhang et al. 2012	PYNT45		d_{33} = 2000	ε_{33} = 2000	k_{31} = 78	
Zhang et al. 2003	BSPT57		d_{33} = 1200	ε_{33} = 3000	k_{31} = 77	
Zhang et al. 2003	BSPT57		d_{31} = -560			
Zhang et al. 2003	BSPT58		d_{33} = 1400	ε_{33} = 3200	k_{31} = 80	
Zhang et al. 2003	BSPT58		d_{31} = -670			
Zhang et al. 2004	BSPT66		d_{33} = 440	ε_{33} = 820	k_{31} = 52	
Zhang et al. 2004	BSPT66		d_{31} = -162			
Ye et al. 2008	BSPT57		d_{33} = 1150 d_{31} = -520	ε_{33} = 3000	k_{31} = 0.52 k_{33} = 0.91	
Ye et al. 2008	BSPT66		d_{33} = 440	ε_{33} = 820	k_{31} = 0.52 k_{33} = 0.88	
Ye et al. 2008	BSPT66		d_{31} = -162			
Ye et al. 2008	PZNT4.5		d_{33} = 2000 d_{31} = -970	ε_{33} = 5200	k_{31} = 0.50 k_{33} = 0.91	
Ye et al. 2008	PZNT8		d_{31} = -1455	ε_{33} = 7700	k_{31} = 0.60 k_{33} = 0.94	
Ye et al. 2008	PZNT12		d_{33} = 576 d_{31} = -217	ε_{33} = 870	k_{31} = 0.52 k_{33} = 0.86	
Ye et al. 2008	PMNT33		d_{33} = 2820 d_{31} = -1330	ε_{33} = 8200	k_{31} = 0.59 k_{33} = 0.94	
Matsubara et al. 2004	KCN-modified KNN		d_{33} = 100 d_{31} = -180	ε_{33} = 220–330	k_{p} = 33–39	1200
Ryu et al. 2007	KZT modifiedKNN		d_{33} = 126	ε_{33} = 590	k_{p} = 42	58
Matsubara et al. 2005	KCT modified KNN		d_{33} = 190	ε_{33} =	k_{p} = 42	1300
Wang et al. 2007	Bi_{2}O_{3} doped KNN		d_{33} = 127	ε_{33} = 1309	k_{p} = 28.3	
Jiang et al. 2009	doped KNN-0.005BF		d_{33} = 257	ε_{33} = 361	k_{p}= 52	45

Ceramics
Reference	Material & heterostructure used for the characterization (electrodes/material, electrode/substrate)	Orientation	Piezoelectric coefficients, d (pC/N)	Relative permittivity, ε_{r}	Electromechanical coupling factor, k	Quality factor
Berlincourt et al. 1958	BaTiO_{3}		d_{15} = 270	ε_{11} = 1440	k_{15} = 0.57	
Berlincourt et al. 1958	BaTiO_{3}		d_{31} = -79	ε_{33} = 1680	k_{31} = 0.49	
Berlincourt et al. 1958	BaTiO_{3}		d_{33} = 191		k_{33} = 0.47	
Tang et al. 2011	BFO		d_{33} = 37		k_{t} = 0.6	
Zhang et al. 1999	PMN-PT		d_{31} = -74	ε_{33} = 1170	k_{31} = -0.312	283
	PZT-5A		d_{31} = -171	ε_{33} = 1700	k_{31} = 0.34	
	PZT-5A		d_{33} = 374		k_{33} = 0.7	
	PZT-5H		d_{15} = 741	ε_{11} = 3130	k_{15} = 0.68	65
	PZT-5H		d_{31} = -274	ε_{33} = 3400	k_{31} = 0.39	
	PZT-5H		d_{33} = 593		k_{33} = 0.75	
	PZT-5K		d_{33} = 870	ε_{33} = 6200	k_{33} = 0.75	
Tanaka et al. 2009	PZN7%PT		d_{33} = 2400	ε_{r} = 6500	k_{33} = 0.94 k_{t} = 0.55	
Pang et al. 2010	ANSZ		d_{33} = 295	1.61	45.5	84
Park et al. 2006	KNN-BZ		d_{33} = 400	2	57.4	48
Cho et al. 2007	KNN-BT		d_{33} = 225	1.06	36.0	
Park et al. 2007	KNN-ST		d_{33} = 220	1.45	40.0	70
Zhao et al. 2007	KNN-CT		d_{33} = 241	1.32	41.0	
Zhang et al. 2006	LNKN		d_{33} = 314	~700	41.2	
Saito et al. 2004	KNN-LS		d_{33} = 270	1.38	50.0	
Saito et al. 2004	LF4		d_{33} = 300	1.57		
Tanaka et al. 2009	Oriented LF4		d_{33} = 416	1.57	61.0	
Pang et al. 2010	ANSZ		d_{33} = 295	1.61	45.5	84
Park et al. 2006	KNN-BZ		d_{33} = 400	2	57.4	48
Cho et al. 2007	KNN-BT		d_{33} = 225	1.06	36.0	
Park et al. 2007	KNN-ST		d_{33} = 220	1.45	40.0	70
Maurya et al. 2013	KNN-CT		d_{33} = 241	1.32	41.0	
Maurya et al. 2013	NBT-BT	(001) Textured samples	d_{33} = 322		...	
Gao et al. 2008	NBT-BT-KBT	(001) Textured samples	d_{33} = 192			
Zou et al. 2016	NBT-KBT	(001) Textured samples	d_{33} = 134		k_{p}= 35	
Saito et al. 2004	NBT-KBT	(001) Textured samples	d_{33} = 217		k_{p} = 61	
Chang et al. 2009	KNLNTS	(001) Textured samples	d_{33} = 416		k_{p} = 64	
Chang et al. 2011	KNNS	(001) Textured samples	d_{33} = 208		k_{p} = 63	
Hussain et al. 2013	KNLN	(001) Textured samples	d_{33} = 192		k_{p} = 60	
Takao et al. 2006	KNNT	(001) Textured samples	d_{33} = 390		k_{p} = 54	
Li et al. 2012	KNN 1 CuO	(001) Textured samples	d_{33} = 123		k_{p} = 54	
Cho et al. 2012	KNN-CuO	(001) Textured samples	d_{33} = 133		k_{p} = 46	
Hao et al. 2012	NKLNT	(001) Textured samples	d_{33} = 310		k_{p} = 43	
Gupta et al. 2014	KNLN	(001) Textured samples	d_{33} = 254			
Hao et al. 2012	KNN	(001) Textured samples	d_{33} = 180		k_{p} = 44	
Bai et al. 2016	BCZT	(001) Textured samples	d_{33} = 470		k_{p} = 47	
Ye et al. 2013	BCZT	(001) Textured samples	d_{33} = 462		k_{p} = 49	
Schultheiß et al. 2017	BCZT-T-H	(001) Textured samples	d_{33} = 580			
OMORI et al. 1990	BCT	(001) Textured samples	d_{33} = 170			
Chan et al. 2008	Pz34 (doped PbTiO_{3})		d_{15} = 43.3	ε_{33} = 237	k_{31} = 4.6	700
Chan et al. 2008	Pz34 (doped PbTiO_{3})		d_{31} = -5.1	ε_{33} = 208	k_{33} = 39.6	
Chan et al. 2008	Pz34 (doped PbTiO_{3})		d_{33} = 46		k_{15} = 22.8	
Chan et al. 2008	Pz34 (doped PbTiO_{3})				k_{p} = 7.4	
Lee et al. 2009	BNKLBT		d_{33} = 163	ε_{r} = 766	k_{31} = 0.188	142
Lee et al. 2009	BNKLBT			ε_{33} = 444.3	k_{t} = 0.524	
Lee et al. 2009	BNKLBT				k_{p} = 0.328	
Sasaki et al. 1999	KNLNTS			ε_{r} = 1156	k_{31} = 0.26	80
Sasaki et al. 1999	KNLNTS			ε_{33} = 746	k_{t} = 0.32	
Sasaki et al. 1999	KNLNTS				k_{p} = 0.43	
Takenaka et al. 1991	(Bi_{0.5}Na_{0.5})TiO_{3} (BNT)-based BNKT		d_{31} = 46	ε_{r} = 650	k_{p} = 0.27	
Takenaka et al. 1991	(Bi_{0.5}Na_{0.5})TiO_{3} (BNT)-based BNKT		d_{33} = 150		k_{31} = 0.165	
Tanaka et al. 1960	(Bi_{0.5}Na_{0.5})TiO_{3} (BNT)-based BNBT		d_{31} = 40	ε_{r} = 580	k_{31} = 0.19	
Tanaka et al. 1960	(Bi_{0.5}Na_{0.5})TiO_{3} (BNT)-based BNBT		d_{33} = 12.5		k_{33} = 0.55	
Hutson 1960	CdS		d_{15} = -14.35			
Hutson 1960	CdS		d_{31} = -3.67			
Hutson 1960	CdS		d_{33} = 10.65			
Schofield et al. 1957	CdS		d_{31} = -1.53			
Schofield et al. 1957	CdS		d_{33} = 2.56			
Egerton et al. 1959	BaCaOTi		d_{31} = -50		k_{15} = 0.19	400
Egerton et al. 1959	BaCaOTi		d_{33} = 150		k_{31} = 0.49	
Egerton et al. 1959	BaCaOTi				k_{33} = 0.325	
Ikeda et al. 1961	Nb_{2}O_{6}Pb		d_{31} = -11		k_{r} = 0.07	11
Ikeda et al. 1961	Nb_{2}O_{6}Pb		d_{33} = 80		k_{31} = 0.045	
Ikeda et al. 1961	Nb_{2}O_{6}Pb				k_{33} = 0.042	
Ikeda et al. 1962	C_{6}H_{17}N_{3}O_{10}S		d_{23} = 84		k_{21} = 0.18	
Ikeda et al. 1962	C_{6}H_{17}N_{3}O_{10}S		d_{21} = 22.7		k_{22} = 0.18	
Ikeda et al. 1962	C_{6}H_{17}N_{3}O_{10}S		d_{25} = 22		k_{23} = 0.44	
Brown et al. 1962	BaTiO_{3} (95%) BaZrO_{3} (5%)				k_{15} = 0.15	200
Brown et al. 1962	BaTiO_{3} (95%) BaZrO_{3} (5%)		d_{31} = -60		k_{31} = 0.40	
Brown et al. 1962	BaTiO_{3} (95%) BaZrO_{3} (5%)		d_{33} = 150		k_{33} = 0.28	
Huston 1960	BaNb_{2}O_{6} (60%) Nb_{2}O_{6}Pb (40%)		d_{31} = -25		k_{r} = 0.16	
Baxter et al. 1960	BaNb_{2}O_{6} (50%) Nb_{2}O_{6}Pb (50%)		d_{31}= -36		k_{r} = 0.16	
Pullin 1962	BaTiO_{3} (97%) CaTiO_{3} (3%)		d_{31} = -53	ε_{33} = 1390	k_{15} = 0.39	
Pullin 1962	BaTiO_{3} (97%) CaTiO_{3} (3%)		d_{33} = 135		k_{31} = 0.17	
Pullin 1962	BaTiO_{3} (97%) CaTiO_{3} (3%)				k_{33} = 0.43	
Berlincourt et al. 1960	BaTiO_{3} (95%) CaTiO_{3} (5%)		d_{15} = -257	ε_{33} = 1355	k_{15} = 0.495	500
Berlincourt et al. 1960	BaTiO_{3} (95%) CaTiO_{3} (5%)		d_{31} = -58		k_{31} = 0.19	
Berlincourt et al. 1960	BaTiO_{3} (95%) CaTiO_{3} (5%)		d_{33} = 150		k_{33} = 0.49	
Berlincourt et al. 1960	BaTiO_{3} (95%) CaTiO_{3} (5%)				k_{r} = 0.3	
Berlincourt et al. 1960	BaTiO_{3} (96%) PbTiO_{3} (4%)		d_{31} = -38	ε_{33} = 990	k_{15} = 0.34	
Berlincourt et al. 1960	BaTiO_{3} (96%) PbTiO_{3} (4%)		d_{33} = 105		k_{31} = 0.14	
Berlincourt et al. 1960	BaTiO_{3} (96%) PbTiO_{3} (4%)				k_{33} = 0.39	
Jaffe et al. 1955	PbHfO_{3} (50%) PbTiO_{3} (50%)		d_{31} = -54		k_{r} = 0.38	
Kell 1962	Nb_{2}O_{6}Pb (80%) BaNb_{2}O_{6} (20%)		d_{31} = 25		k_{r} = 0.20	15
Brown et al. 1962	Nb_{2}O_{6}Pb (70%) BaNb_{2}O_{6} (30%)		d_{31} = -40	ε_{33} = 900	k_{31} = 0.13	350
Brown et al. 1962	Nb_{2}O_{6}Pb (70%) BaNb_{2}O_{6} (30%)		d_{33} = 100		k_{33} = 0.3	
Brown et al. 1962	Nb_{2}O_{6}Pb (70%) BaNb_{2}O_{6} (30%)				k_{r} = 0.24	
Berlincourt et al. 1960	PbTiO_{3} (52%) PbZrO_{3} (48%)		d_{15} = 166		k_{15} = 0.40	1170
Berlincourt et al. 1960	PbTiO_{3} (52%) PbZrO_{3} (48%)		d_{31} = -43		k_{31} = 0.17	
Berlincourt et al. 1960	PbTiO_{3} (52%) PbZrO_{3} (48%)		d_{33} = 110		k_{33} = 0.43	
Berlincourt et al. 1960	PbTiO_{3} (52%) PbZrO_{3} (48%)				k_{r} = 0.28	
Berlincourt et al. 1960	PbTiO_{3} (50%) lead Zirconate (50%)		d_{15} = 166		k_{15} = 0.504	950
Berlincourt et al. 1960	PbTiO_{3} (50%) lead Zirconate (50%)		d_{31} = -43		k_{31} = 0.23	
Berlincourt et al. 1960	PbTiO_{3} (50%) lead Zirconate (50%)		d_{33} = 110		k_{33} = 0.546	
Berlincourt et al. 1960	PbTiO_{3} (50%) lead Zirconate (50%)				k_{r} = 0.397	
Egerton et al. 1959	KNbO_{3} (50%) NaNbO_{3} (50%)		d_{31} = -32			140
Egerton et al. 1959	KNbO_{3} (50%) NaNbO_{3} (50%)		d_{33} = 80		k_{31} = 0.21	
Egerton et al. 1959	KNbO_{3} (50%) NaNbO_{3} (50%)				k_{33} = 0.51	
Brown et al. 1962	NaNbO_{3} (80%) Cd_{2}Nb_{2}O_{7} (20%)		d_{31} = -80	ε_{33} = 2000	k_{31} = 0.17	
Brown et al. 1962	NaNbO_{3} (80%) Cd_{2}Nb_{2}O_{7} (20%)		d_{33} = 200		k_{33} = 0.42	
Brown et al. 1962	NaNbO_{3} (80%) Cd_{2}Nb_{2}O_{7} (20%)				k_{r} = 0.30	
Schofield et al. 1957	BaTiO_{3} (95%) CaTiO_{3} (5%) CoCO_{3} (0.25%)		d_{31} = -60	ε_{33} = 1605	k_{r} = 0.33	
Pullin 1962	BaTiO_{3} (80%) PbTiO_{3} (12%) CaTiO_{3} (8%)		d_{31} = -31		k_{31} = 0.15	1200
Pullin 1962	BaTiO_{3} (80%) PbTiO_{3} (12%) CaTiO_{3} (8%)		d_{33} = 79		k_{33} = 0.41	
Pullin 1962	BaTiO_{3} (80%) PbTiO_{3} (12%) CaTiO_{3} (8%)				k_{r} = 0.24	
Defaÿ 2011	AlN (Pt-Mo)		d_{31} = -2.5			
Shibata et al. 2011	KNN(Pt-Pt)	<001>	d_{31} = -96.3	ε_{r} = 1100		
Shibata et al. 2011	KNN(Pt-Pt)	<001>	d_{33} = 138.2			
Sessler 1981	PVDF		d_{31} = 17.9		k_{31} = 10.3	
Sessler 1981	PVDF		d_{32} = 0.9		k_{33} = 12.6	
Sessler 1981	PVDF		d_{33} = -27.1			
Ren et al. 2017	PVDF		d_{31} = 23	ε_{r} = 106		
Ren et al. 2017	PVDF		d_{32} = 2			
Ren et al. 2017	PVDF		d_{33} = -21			
Tsubouchi et al. 1981	Epi AlN/Al_{2}O_{3}	<001>	d_{33} = 5.53	ε_{33} = 9.5	k_{t} = 6.5	2490

Nanomaterials
Reference	Material	Structure	Piezoelectric coefficients, d (pC/N)	Characterization method	Size (nm)
Ke et al. 2008	NaNbO_{3}	nanowire	d_{33} = 0.85-4.26 pm/V	PFM	d = 100
Wang et al. 2008	KNbO_{3}	nanowire	d_{33} = 0.9 pm/V	PFM	d = 100
Zhang et al. 2004	PZT	nanowire		PFM	d = 45
Zhao et al. 2004	ZnO	nanobelt	d_{33} = 14.3-26.7 pm/V	PFM	w = 360 t = 65
Luo et al. 2003	PZT	nanoshell	d_{33} = 90 pm/V	PFM	d = 700 t = 90
Yun et al. 2002	BaTiO_{3}	nanowire	d_{33} = 0.5 pm/V	PFM	d = 120
Lin et al. 2008	CdS	nanowire		Bending with AFM tip	d = 150
Wang et al. 2007	PZT	nanofiber	piezoelectric voltage constant~0.079 Vm/N	Bending using a tungsten probe	d = 10
Wang et al. 2007	BaTiO_{3}	-	d_{33} = 45 pC/N	Direct tensile test	d ~ 280
Jeong et al. 2014	Alkaline niobate (KNLN)	film	d_{33} = 310 pC/N	-	
Park et al. 2010	BaTiO_{3}	Thin film	d_{33} = 190 pC/N		
Stoppel et al. 2011	AlN	Thin film	d_{33} =5 pC/N	AFM	
Lee et al. 2017	WSe_{2}	2D nanosheet	d_{11} = 3.26 pm/V		
Zhu et al. 2014	MoS_{2}	Free standing layer	e_{11} = 2900pc/m	AFM	
Zhong et al. 2017	PET/EVA/PET	film	d_{33} = 6300 pC/N		
