= Oscillator linewidth =

Lindwidth of an oscillator

The concept of a linewidth is borrowed from laser spectroscopy. The linewidth of a laser is a measure of its phase noise. The spectrogram of a laser is produced by passing its light through a prism. The spectrogram of the output of a pure noise-free laser will consist of a single infinitely thin line. If the laser exhibits phase noise, the line will have non-zero width. The greater the phase noise, the wider the line. The same will be true with oscillators. The spectrum of the output of a noise-free oscillator has energy at each of the harmonics of the output signal, but the bandwidth of each harmonic will be zero. If the oscillator exhibits phase noise, the harmonics will not have zero bandwidth. The more phase noise the oscillator exhibits, the wider the bandwidth of each harmonic.

Phase noise is a noise in the phase of the signal. Consider the following noise free signal:

v(t) = Acos(2πf_{0}t).

Phase noise is added to this signal by adding a stochastic process represented by φ to the signal as follows:

v(t) = Acos(2πf_{0}t + φ(t)).

If the phase noise in an oscillator stems from white noise sources, then the power spectral density (PSD) of the phase noise produced by an oscillator will be S_{φ}(f) = n/f^{2}, where n specifies the amount of noise. The PSD of the output signal would then be

$$S_v(f) = \frac{A^2}{2}\frac{cf_0^2}{c^2 \pi^2 f_0^4 + (f - f_0)^2},$$

where n = 2cf_{0}^{2}. Define the corner frequency f_{Δ} = cπ f_{0}^{2} as the linewidth of the oscillator. Then

$$S_v(f_0 + \Delta f) = \frac{A^2}{2\pi}\frac{f_\Delta}{f_\Delta^2 + \Delta f^2}.$$

It is more common to report oscillator phase noise as L, the ratio of the single-sideband (SSB) phase noise power to the power in the fundamental (in dBc/Hz). In this case

$$L(\Delta f) = \frac{1}{\pi}\frac{f_\Delta}{f_\Delta^2 + \Delta f^2}.$$

Adding phase noise neither increases nor decreases the power of the signal. It simply redistributes the power by increasing the bandwidth over which the signal is present while decreasing the amplitude of the signal that occurs at the nominal oscillation frequency. The total noise power, as found by integrating the power spectral density over all frequencies, remains constant regardless of the amount of phase noise. This is illustrated in the figures on the right. It can be proven by integrating L over all frequencies to compute the total power of the signal.

$$\int_{-\infty}^{\infty}L(\Delta f)d\Delta f = \frac{f_\Delta}{\pi}\int_{-\infty}^{\infty}\frac{d\Delta f}{f_\Delta^2 + \Delta f^2} = \left.\frac{1}{\pi}\tan^{-1}(\frac{\Delta f}{f_\Delta})\right|_{-\infty}^{\infty}= 1$$

== See also ==
- Laser linewidth
- Spectral linewidth
- Introduction to RF Simulation and its Application by Ken Kundert
