= William Mitchell (physicist) =

British physicist, professor of physics

Sir Edgar William John Mitchell, CBE FRS (September 25, 1925 – October 30, 2002) was a British physicist, professor of physics at Reading and Oxford, and he helped pioneer the field of neutron scattering.

Born in Kingsbridge, Devon, England, he studied physics at Sheffield University, which had become an important centre for research in radar and defence communications. In 1946, he took up a research position with Metropolitan-Vickers, leading to a secondment to Bristol University, where Nobel laureate Nevill Mott was head of the department. After gaining his PhD, he took a position at Reading University in 1951, becoming professor of physics in 1961, and later dean of science and deputy vice chancellor. In 1978 he was named Dr Lee's Professor of Experimental Philosophy at Oxford University and became the head of the Clarendon laboratory.

He was also a skilled administrator who served in many public capacities. He became chairman of SERC in 1985, at a time of conflict between the British government and higher education over funding and independence. He was vice-president of the European Science Foundation from 1989 to 1992 and president of CERN in 1991. Mitchell was also a member of the SEPP Board of Science Advisors. He won the Richard Glazebrook Medal and Prize in 1996.
