= Hansen Experimental Physics Laboratory =

Research center at Stanford University

The Hansen Experimental Physics Laboratory (HEPL) is a facility at Stanford University, California. It was founded in 1947, aiming to promote interdisciplinary enterprises across different branches of science.
