= Surface acoustic wave =

Sound wave which travels along the surface of an elastic material

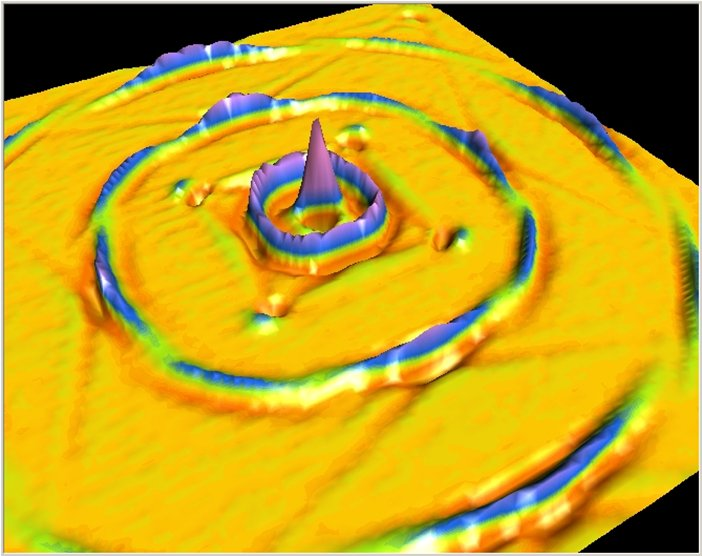
Experimental image of surface acoustic waves on a crystal of tellurium oxide

A surface acoustic wave (SAW) is an acoustic wave traveling along the surface of a material exhibiting elasticity, with an amplitude that typically decays exponentially with depth into the material, such that they are confined to a depth of about one wavelength.

== Discovery ==
SAWs were first explained in 1885 by Lord Rayleigh, who described the surface acoustic mode of propagation and predicted its properties in his classic paper. Named after their discoverer, Rayleigh waves have a longitudinal and a vertical shear component that can couple with any media like additional layers in contact with the surface. This coupling strongly affects the amplitude and velocity of the wave, allowing SAW sensors to directly sense mass and mechanical properties. The term 'Rayleigh waves' is often used synonymously with 'SAWs', although strictly speaking there are multiple types of surface acoustic waves, such as Love waves, which are shear waves caused by a softer solid layer covering the surface and polarised in the plane of the surface, rather than waves having longitudinal and shear vertical components.

SAWs such as Love and Rayleigh waves tend to propagate for much longer than bulk waves, as they only have to travel in two dimensions, rather than in three. Furthermore, in general they have a lower velocity than their bulk counterparts.

== SAW devices ==
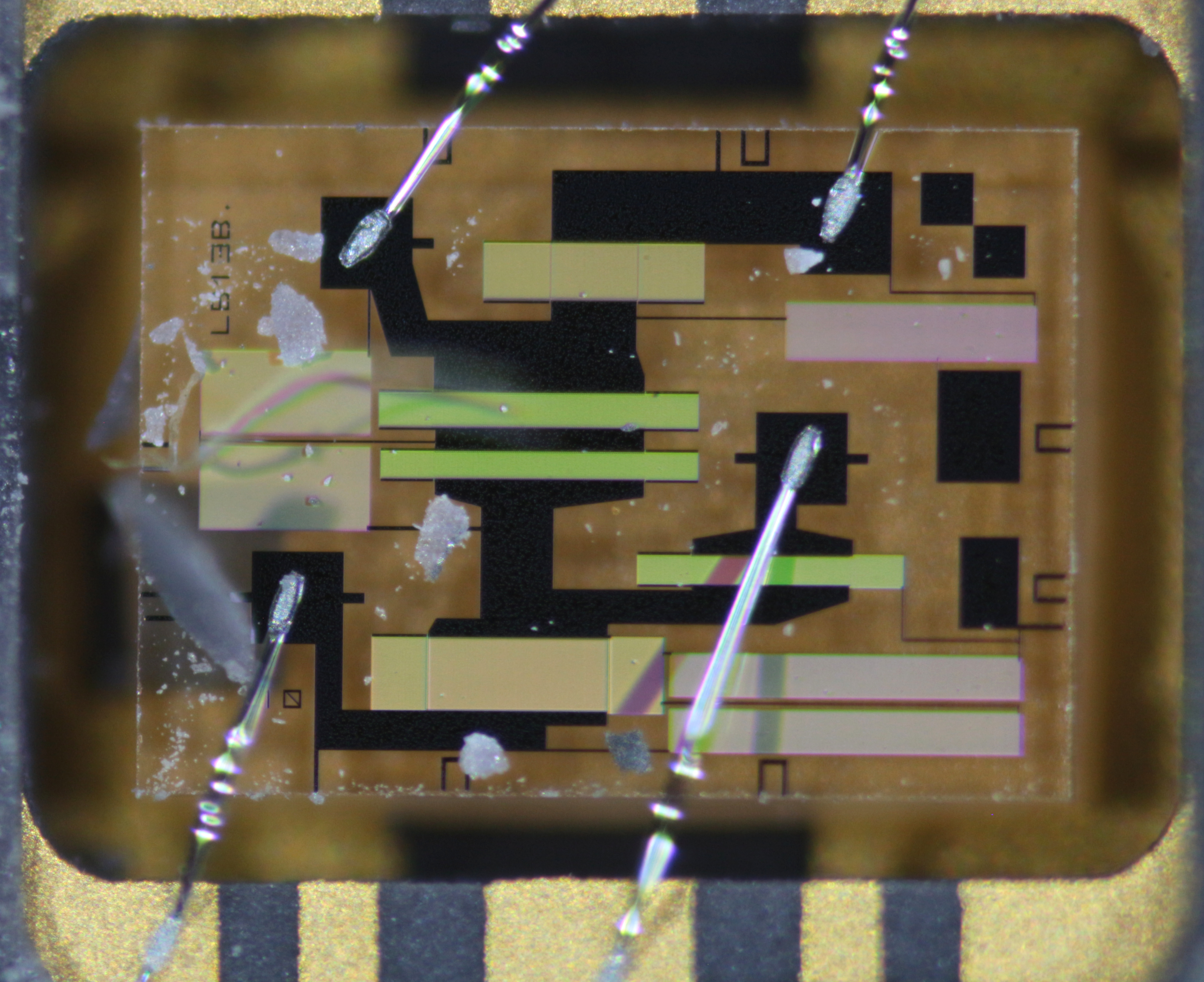
SAW filter inside

Surface acoustic wave devices provide wide-range of applications with the use of electronic system, including delay lines, filters, correlators and DC to DC converters. The possibilities of these SAW device could provide potential field in radar and communication systems.

=== Application in electronic components ===
This kind of wave is commonly used in devices called SAW devices in electronic circuits. SAW devices are used as filters, oscillators and transformers, devices that are based on the transduction of acoustic waves. The transduction from electric energy to mechanical energy (in the form of SAWs) is accomplished by the use of piezoelectric materials.

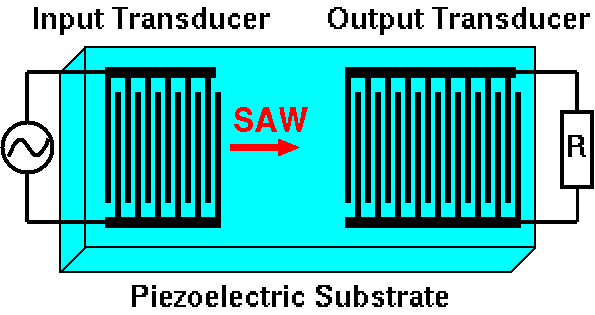
Schematic picture of a typical SAW device design

Electronic devices employing SAWs normally use one or more interdigital transducers (IDTs) to convert acoustic waves to electrical signals and vice versa by exploiting the piezoelectric effect of certain materials, like quartz, lithium niobate, lithium tantalate, lanthanum gallium silicate, etc. These devices are fabricated by substrate cleaning/treatments like polishing, metallisation, photolithography, and passivation/protection (dielectric) layer manufacturing. These are typical process steps used in manufacturing of semiconductors like silicon integrated circuits.

All parts of the device (substrate, its surface, metallisation material type, thickness of metallisation, its edges formed by photolithography, layers - like passivation coating the metallisation) have effect on the performance of the SAW devices because propagation of Rayleigh waves is highly dependent on the substrate material surface, its quality and all layers in contact with the substrate. For example in SAW filters the sampling frequency is dependent on the width of the IDT fingers, the power handling capability is related to the thickness and materials of the IDT fingers, and the temperature stability depends not only of the temperature behavior of the substrate but also on the metals selected for the IDT electrodes and the possible dielectric layers coating the substrate and the electrodes.

SAW filters are now used in mobile telephones, and provide technical advantages in performance, cost, and size over other filter technologies such as quartz crystals (based on bulk waves), LC filters, and waveguide filters specifically at frequencies below 1.5-2.5 GHz depending on the RF power needed to be filtered. Complementing technology to SAW for frequencies above 1.5-2.5 GHz is based on thin-film bulk acoustic resonators (TFBAR, or FBAR).

Much research has been done in the last 20 years in the area of surface acoustic wave sensors. Sensor applications include all areas of sensing (such as chemical, optical, thermal, pressure, acceleration, torque and biological). SAW sensors have seen relatively modest commercial success to date, but are commonly commercially available for some applications such as touchscreen displays. They have been successfully applied to torque sensing in motorsport powertrains and high performance aerospace applications as well as temperature sensing in harsh environments such as high voltage electrical power transmission and the combined sensing of torque and temperature on the rotor of electric motors

=== SAW device applications in radio and television ===
SAW resonators are used in many of the same applications in which quartz crystals are used, because they can operate at higher frequency. They are often used in radio transmitters where tunability is not required. They are often used in applications such as garage door opener remote controls, short range radio frequency links for computer peripherals, and other devices where channelization is not required. Where a radio link might use several channels, quartz crystal oscillators are more commonly used to drive a phase locked loop. Since the resonant frequency of a SAW device is set by the mechanical properties of the crystal, it does not drift as much as a simple LC oscillator, where conditions such as capacitor performance and battery voltage will vary substantially with temperature and age.

SAW filters are also often used in radio receivers, as they can have precisely determined and narrow passbands. This is helpful in applications where a single antenna must be shared between a transmitter and a receiver operating at closely spaced frequencies. SAW filters are also frequently used in television receivers, for extracting subcarriers from the signal; until the analog switchoff, the extraction of digital audio subcarriers from the intermediate frequency strip of a television receiver or video recorder was one of the main markets for SAW filters.

Early pioneer Jeffery Collins incorporated surface acoustic wave devices in a Skynet receiver he developed in the 1970s. It synchronised signals faster than existing technology.

They are also often used in digital receivers, and are well suited to superhet applications. This is because the intermediate frequency signal is always at a fixed frequency after the local oscillator has been mixed with the received signal, and so a filter with a fixed frequency and high Q provides excellent removal of unwanted or interference signals. In these applications, SAW filters are almost always used with a phase locked loop synthesized local oscillator, or a varicap driven oscillator.

== SAW in geophysics ==
In seismology, surface acoustic waves, mainly Rayleigh waves, could become the most destructive type of seismic wave produced by earthquakes due to their propagation in two dimensions along the surface. They also can propagate in more complex media, such as ocean bottom, rocks, etc. so that they need to be noticed and monitored by people to protect living environment.

== SAW in weighing ==
Surface Acoustic Wave (SAW) technology has been adapted for high-precision industrial weighing by leveraging the same piezoelectric principles used in electronic filters and sensors. In weighing systems, SAW transducers generate and measure acoustic waves along a precisely engineered substrate, allowing for extremely accurate deformation detection under load. This enables resolution levels far exceeding those of traditional strain gauge systems while maintaining superior durability and temperature stability. The inherent stability of SAW devices—rooted in their fixed mechanical resonance—results in weighing systems that require less frequent calibration and deliver consistent performance in demanding industrial environments.

== SAW in quantum acoustics ==
SAWs play a key role in the field of quantum acoustics (QA) where, in contrast to quantum optics (QO) which studies the interaction between matter and light, the interaction between quantum systems (phonons, (quasi-)particles and artificial qubits) and acoustic waves is analysed. The propagation speed of the respective waves of QA is five orders of magnitude slower than that of QO. As a result, QA offers a different perspective of the quantum regime in terms of wavelengths which QO has not covered. One example of these additions is the quantum optical investigation of qubits and quantum dots fabricated in such a way as to emulate essential aspects of natural atoms, e.g. energy-level structures and coupling to an electromagnetic field. These artificial atoms are arranged into a circuit dubbed 'giant atoms', due to its size reaching 10^{−4}–10^{−3} m. Quantum optical experiments generally made use of microwave fields for matter-light interaction, but because of the difference of wavelength between the giant atoms and microwave fields, the latter of which has a wavelength ranging between 10^{−2}–10^{−1} m, SAWs were used instead for their more suitable wavelength (10^{−6} m).

Within the fields of magnonics and spintronics, a resonant coupling between spin waves and surface acoustic waves with equal wave-vector and frequency allows for the transfer of energy from one form to another, in either direction. This can for example be useful in the construction of magnetic field sensors, which are sensitive to both the intensity and direction of external magnetic fields. These sensors, constructed using a structure of magnetostrictive and piezoelectric layers have the benefit of operating without batteries and wires, as well as having a broad range of operating conditions, such as high temperatures or rotating systems.

=== Single electron control ===
Animation of an electron transported via a surface acoustic wave.

Even at the smallest scales of current semiconductor technology, each operation is carried out by huge streams of electrons. Reducing the number of electrons involved in these processes, with the ultimate goal of achieving single electron control is a serious challenge. This is due to the electrons being highly interactive with each other and their surroundings, making it difficult to separate just one from the rest. The use of SAWs can help with achieving this goal. When SAWs are generated on a piezoelectric surface, the strain wave generates an electromagnetic potential. The potential minima can then trap single electrons, allowing them to be individually transported. Although this technique was first thought of as a way to accurately define a standard unit of current, it turned out to be more useful in the field of quantum information. Usually, qubits are stationary, making the transfer of information between them difficult. The single electrons, carried by the SAWs, can be used as so called flying qubits, able to transport information from one place to another. To realise this a single electron source is needed, as well as a receiver between which the electron can be transported. Quantum dots (QD) are typically used for these stationary electron confinements. This potential minimum is sometimes called a SAW QD. The process, as seen in the GIF on the right, is typically as follows. First SAWs are generated with an interdigital transducer with specific dimensions between the electrodes to get the favorable wavelengths. Then from the stationary QD the electron quantum tunnels to the potential minimum, or SAW QD. The SAWs transfer some kinetic energy to the electron, driving it forward. It is then carried through a one dimensional channel on a surface of piezoelectric semiconductor material like GaAs. Finally, the electron tunnels out of the SAW QD and into the receiver QD, after which the transfer is complete. This process can also be repeated in both directions.

== SAW and 2D materials ==
As acoustic vibrations can interact with the moving charges in a piezoelectric semiconductor through the strain-induced piezoelectric field in bulk materials, this acoustoelectric (AE) coupling is also important in 2D materials, such as graphene. In these 2D materials the two-dimensional electron gas has band gap energies generally much higher than the energy of the SAW phonons traveling through the material. Therefore the SAW phonons are typically absorbed via intra-band electronic transitions. In graphene these transitions are the only way, as the linear dispersion relation of its electrons prevents momentum/energy conservation when it would absorb a SAW for an inter-band transition.

Often the interaction between moving charges and SAWs results in the diminishing of the SAW intensity as it moves through the 2D electron gas, as well as re-normalizing the SAW velocity. The charges take over kinetic energy from the SAW and lose this energy again through carrier scattering.

Aside from SAW intensity attenuation, there are specific situations in which the wave can be amplified as well. By applying a voltage over the material, the charge carriers may obtain a higher drift speed than the SAW. Then they pass on a part of their kinetic energy to the SAW, causing it to amplify its intensity and velocity. The converse works as well. If the SAW is moving faster than the carriers, it may transfer kinetic energy to them, and thereby losing some velocity and intensity.

== SAW in microfluidics ==
In recent years, attention has been drawn to using SAWs to drive microfluidic actuation and a variety of other processes. Owing to the mismatch of sound velocities in the SAW substrate and fluid, SAWs can be efficiently transferred into the fluid, creating significant inertial forces and fluid velocities. This mechanism can be exploited to drive fluid actions such as pumping, mixing, and jetting.[8] To drive these processes, there is a change of mode of the wave at the liquid-substrate interface. In the substrate, the SAW wave is a transverse wave and upon entering the droplet the wave becomes a longitudinal wave.[9] It is this longitudinal wave that creates the flow of fluid within the microfluidic droplet, allowing mixing to take place. This technique can be used as an alternative to microchannels and microvalves for manipulation of substrates, allowing for an open system.

This mechanism has also been used in droplet-based microfluidics for droplet manipulation. Notably, using SAW as an actuation mechanism, droplets were pushed towards two or more outlets for sorting. Moreover, SAWs were used for droplet size modulation, splitting, trapping, tweezing, and nanofluidic pipetting. Droplet impact on flat and inclined surfaces has been manipulated and controlled using SAW.

PDMS (polydimethylsiloxane) is a material that can be used to create microchannels and microfluidic chips. It has many uses, including in experiments where living cells are to be tested or processed. If living organisms need to be kept alive, it is important to monitor and control their environment, such as heat and pH levels; however, if these elements are not regulated, the cells may die or it may result in unwanted reactions. PDMS has been found to absorb acoustic energy, causing the PDMS to heat up quickly (exceeding 2000 Kelvin/second). The use of SAW as a way to heat these PDMS devices, along with liquids inside microchannels, is now a technique that can be done in a controlled manner with the ability to manipulate the temperature to within 0.1 °C.

The development of Flexible Surface Acoustic Wave (SAW) devices has been a significant driver in the advancement of wearable technology and microfluidic systems. These devices are typically fabricated on polymer substrates, such as Polyethylene Naphthalate (PEN) and polyimide, and utilize sputtering deposition of materials like AlN and ZnO. This combination of flexibility and advanced materials has expanded their application potential across various fields.

== SAW in flow measurement ==
Surface acoustic waves can be used for flow measurement. SAW relies on the propagation of a wave front, which appears similar to seismic activities. The waves are generated at the excitation centre and spread out along the surface of a solid material. An electric pulse induces them to generate SAWs that propagate like the waves of an earthquake. Interdigital transducer acts as sender and as receiver. When one is in sender mode, the two most distant ones act as receivers. The SAWs travel along the surface of the measuring tube, but a portion will couple out to the liquid. The decoupling angle depends on the liquid respectively the propagation velocity of the wave which is specific to the liquid. On the other side of the measuring tube, portions of the wave will couple into the tube and continue their way along its surface to the next interdigital transducer. Another portion will be coupled out again and travels back to the other side of the measuring tube where the effect repeats itself and the transducer on this side detects the wave. That means excitation of any one transducer here will lead to a sequence of input signals on two other transducers in the distance. Two of the transducers send their signals in the direction of flow, two in the other direction.

== See also ==
- Linear elasticity
- Love wave
- Phonon
- Picosecond ultrasonics
- Rayleigh wave
- Surface plasmon polariton
- Ultrasound
