= Interdigital transducer =

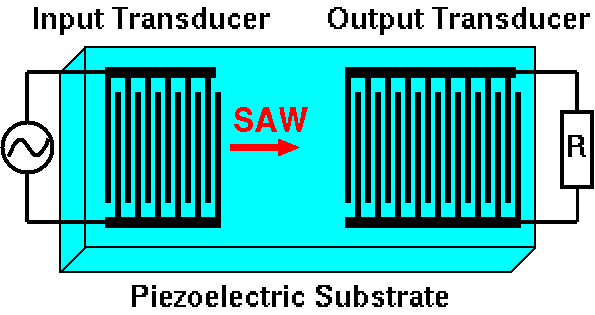
Schematic picture of a typical SAW signal processing device containing two interdigital transducers.

An interdigital transducer (IDT) is a device that consists of two interlocking comb-shaped arrays of metallic electrodes (in the fashion of a zipper). These metallic electrodes are deposited on the surface of a piezoelectric substrate, such as quartz or lithium niobate, to form a periodic structure.

== Function ==
IDTs primary function is to convert electric signals to surface acoustic waves (SAW) by generating periodically distributed mechanical forces via piezoelectric effect (an input transducer).

The same principle is applied to the conversion of SAW back to electric signals (an output transducer). These processes of generation and reception of SAW can be used in different types of SAW signal processing devices, such as band pass filters, delay lines, resonators, sensors, etc.

IDT was first proposed by Richard M. White and Fred W. Voltmer in 1965.
