= Index of physics articles (O) =

The index of physics articles is split into multiple pages due to its size.

To navigate by individual letter use the table of contents below.

== O ==
- OECC
- OPAL detector
- OPERA experiment
- OSA Fellow
- OSO 3
- OSO 7
- OVRO 40 meter Telescope
- OZI Rule
- Oak Ridge National Laboratory
- Oberth effect
- Objective (optics)
- Oblique correction
- Oblique shock
- Oblique wing
- Observable
- Observable universe
- Observational cosmology
- Observer (general relativity)
- Observer (quantum physics)
- Observer (special relativity)
- Observer effect (physics)
- Ocean gyre
- Ocean thermal energy conversion
- Oceanography
- Ocellus Lucanus
- Octavio Novaro
- Odd molecule
- Odd sympathy
- Oersted
- Oersted Medal
- Ofer Biham
- Ofer Lahav
- Off-axis optical system
- Oganesson
- Ogden Rood
- Ohm
- Ohm's law
- Ohmic contact
- Ohnesorge number
- Oil drop experiment
- Okorokov effect
- Ola Hunderi
- Olaf Dreyer
- Olami–Feder–Christensen model
- Olav Holt
- Olbers' paradox
- Old quantum theory
- Oldroyd-B model
- Ole Jacob Broch
- Oleg D. Jefimenko
- Oleg Firsov
- Oleg Losev
- Oleg Sushkov
- Olexander Smakula
- Olga Kennard
- Olinto De Pretto
- Oliver E. Buckley Condensed Matter Prize
- Oliver Heaviside
- Oliver Lodge
- Olli Lounasmaa
- Olympia Academy
- Omega baryon
- Omega meson
- On-Line Isotope Mass Separator
- On Physical Lines of Force
- On shell and off shell
- On the Shoulders of Giants (book)
- On the movement of small particles suspended in a stationary liquid demanded by the molecular-kinetic theory of heat
- One-electron universe
- One-loop Feynman diagram
- One-way speed of light
- Onium
- Online refuelling
- Onsager reciprocal relations
- Onset of deconfinement
- Oops-Leon
- Oort constants
- Opacity (optics)
- Opalescence
- Open-pool Australian lightwater reactor
- OpenFOAM
- OpenScientist
- Open Source Physics
- Open quantum system
- Open shell
- Operator (physics)
- Operator product expansion
- Oppenheimer–Phillips process
- Optic crystals
- Optical Fiber Technology
- Optical Gravitational Lensing Experiment
- Optical Physics
- Optical Review
- Optical Society
- Optical Society of Japan
- Optical aberration
- Optical amplifier
- Optical autocorrelation
- Optical axis
- Optical black hole
- Optical brightener
- Optical cavity
- Optical chopper
- Optical circulator
- Optical coating
- Optical coherence tomography
- Optical communication
- Optical conductivity
- Optical contact bonding
- Optical depth
- Optical downconverter
- Optical equivalence theorem
- Optical feedback
- Optical field
- Optical flat
- Optical force
- Optical format
- Optical lattice
- Optical lens design
- Optical levitation
- Optical medium
- Optical metamaterial
- Optical microsphere
- Optical modulator
- Optical modulators using semiconductor nano-structures
- Optical neural network
- Optical parametric amplifier
- Optical parametric oscillator
- Optical path
- Optical path length
- Optical phenomenon
- Optical phonon
- Optical physics
- Optical power
- Optical properties of carbon nanotubes
- Optical pulsar
- Optical pumping
- Optical reader
- Optical rectification
- Optical ring resonators
- Optical rotatory dispersion
- Optical scalars
- Optical science
- Optical sciences
- Optical sectioning
- Optical sine theorem
- Optical superresolution
- Optical switch
- Optical telescope
- Optical theorem
- Optical train
- Optical transition radiation
- Optical tweezers
- Optical window
- Optically stimulated luminescence
- Opticks
- Optics
- Optics & Photonics News
- Optics (physics)
- Optics Classification and Indexing Scheme
- Optics Communications
- Optics Express
- Optics Letters
- Optics and Photonics News
- Optics and Spectroscopy
- Optik (journal)
- Optoelectric nuclear battery
- Optoelectronics
- Optofluidics
- Optomechanics
- Orb (optics)
- Orbit
- Orbit (dynamics)
- Orbit equation
- Orbit phasing
- Orbital angular momentum multiplexing
- Orbital angular momentum of light
- Orbital decay
- Orbital eccentricity
- Orbital elements
- Orbital inclination
- Orbital integral
- Orbital mechanics
- Orbital motion
- Orbital motion (quantum)
- Orbital node
- Orbital period
- Orbital plane (astronomy)
- Orbital state vectors
- Orbiting body
- Orbitrap
- Ordal Demokan
- Order and disorder (physics)
- Order operator
- Ordered exponential
- Orders of magnitude (charge)
- Orders of magnitude (density)
- Orders of magnitude (energy)
- Orders of magnitude (entropy)
- Orders of magnitude (force)
- Orders of magnitude (length)
- Orders of magnitude (luminous flux)
- Orders of magnitude (magnetic field)
- Orders of magnitude (mass)
- Orders of magnitude (power)
- Orders of magnitude (pressure)
- Orders of magnitude (radiation)
- Orders of magnitude (resistance)
- Orders of magnitude (specific energy density)
- Orders of magnitude (specific heat capacity)
- Orders of magnitude (temperature)
- Orders of magnitude (voltage)
- Orest Khvolson
- Oreste Piccioni
- Orfeu Bertolami
- Organic field-effect transistor
- Organic nonlinear optical materials
- Organic photorefractive materials
- Organic superconductor
- Orientifold
- Orifice plate
- Origin of avian flight
- Ornstein–Zernike equation
- Orr–Sommerfeld equation
- Orso Mario Corbino
- OrthoCAD Network Research Cell
- Orthobaric density
- Orthometric height
- Orthomode transducer
- Orthorhombic crystal system
- Orthovoltage X-rays
- Osborne Reynolds
- Oscar Lanford
- Oscar Sala
- Oscar W. Greenberg
- Oscillation
- Oscillator linewidth
- Oscillator phase noise
- Oscillatory universe
- Oscillon
- Osculating orbit
- Oseen's approximation
- Oseen equations
- Oskar Heil
- Oskar Klein
- Oskar Klein Memorial Lecture
- Oskar Ritter
- Osmosis
- Osoaviakhim-1
- Ostro
- Ostwald ripening
- Ostwald–Freundlich equation
- Otoacoustic emission
- Ottaviano-Fabrizio Mossotti
- Otto Bastiansen
- Otto Hahn
- Otto Haxel
- Otto Klemperer (physicist)
- Otto Kratky
- Otto Laporte
- Otto Laporte Award
- Otto Lehmann (physicist)
- Otto Lummer
- Otto Robert Frisch
- Otto Scherzer
- Otto Schmitt
- Otto Stern
- Otto Wiener (physicist)
- Otto cycle
- Otto von Guericke
- Otto Øgrim
- Our Mr. Sun
- Outdoor–indoor transmission class
- Outflow channels
- Outhouse (unit)
- Outline of applied physics
- Outline of astronomy
- Outline of geophysics
- Outline of physical science
- Outline of physics
- Ouzo effect
- Over/under cable coiling
- Overflow (software)
- Overlap matrix
- Overtone
- Owen Chamberlain
- Owen Willans Richardson
- Oxford Calculators
- Oxford Electric Bell
- Oxide thin-film transistor
- Oxsensis
- Oxygen-burning process
- Oxygen permeability
- Oyo Buturi
- Øyvind Grøn
- Ozsváth–Schücking metric
