= Orders of magnitude (disambiguation) =

An order of magnitude is an approximation of the logarithm of a value relative to some contextually understood reference value.

Orders of magnitude may also refer to:

== Examples of orders of magnitude ==
- Orders of magnitude (acceleration)
- Orders of magnitude (angular momentum)
- Orders of magnitude (area)
- Orders of magnitude (bit rate)
- Orders of magnitude (charge)
- Orders of magnitude (current)
- Orders of magnitude (data)
- Orders of magnitude (energy)
- Orders of magnitude (entropy)
- Orders of magnitude (force)
- Orders of magnitude (frequency)
- Orders of magnitude (illuminance)
- Orders of magnitude (length)
- Orders of magnitude (luminance)
- Orders of magnitude (magnetic field)
- Orders of magnitude (mass)
- Orders of magnitude (molar concentration)
- Orders of magnitude (numbers)
- Orders of magnitude (power)
- Orders of magnitude (pressure)
- Orders of magnitude (probability)
- Orders of magnitude (radiation)
- Orders of magnitude (specific heat capacity)
- Orders of magnitude (speed)
- Orders of magnitude (temperature)
- Orders of magnitude (time)
- Orders of magnitude (voltage)
- Orders of magnitude (volume)

== Other ==
- Orders of Magnitude (album), an album by Information Society
- "Orders of Magnitude" (Star Trek: Strange New Worlds), an episode of the fourth season of Star Trek: Strange New Worlds
