= OOM =

OOM or oom may refer to:

== Science and technology ==
- Out of memory, a pathological state of a computer operation
- Object-oriented modeling, a modeling technique based on objects
- Order of magnitude, a measurement term
  - Orders of magnitude (disambiguation), different examples
- OnePoint Operations Manager (OOM), Mission Critical Software's predecessor of Microsoft's System Center Operations Manager

== Geography ==
- Oom Bay, Mac. Robertson Land, Antarctica
- Oom Island, Mac. Robertson Land, Antarctica

== Other uses ==
- Pierre Bernard (yogi) (1875–1955), known as "The Great Oom", "The Omnipotent Oom" and "Oom the Magnificent", a pioneering American yogi, scholar, occultist, philosopher, mystic and businessman
- Order of Myths, an Alabama Mardi Gras organization
- Officer of the Order of Merit of the Police Forces post-nominal letters (OOM)
- "Out of Mana", a track from the album Science Fiction by Brand New
- Oom, a character in DC Comics
- Odyssey of the Mind (OoM), a creative problem-solving competition
- Zoom Airlines (ICAO code)
- OOM, IATA airport code of Cooma–Snowy Mountains Airport, Cooma, New South Wales, Australia

== See also ==
- Ooms, a Dutch language surname
