= OCIS =

OCIS may refer to:

- Optics Classification and Indexing Scheme
- Oxford Centre for Islamic Studies
- Ocean City Intermediate School (of Ocean City School District)
