= Optical lift =

Lifting force due to light

Optical lift is an optical analogue of aerodynamic lift, in which a cambered refractive object with differently shaped top and bottom surfaces experiences a stable transverse lift force when placed in a uniform stream of light.

== Discovery ==
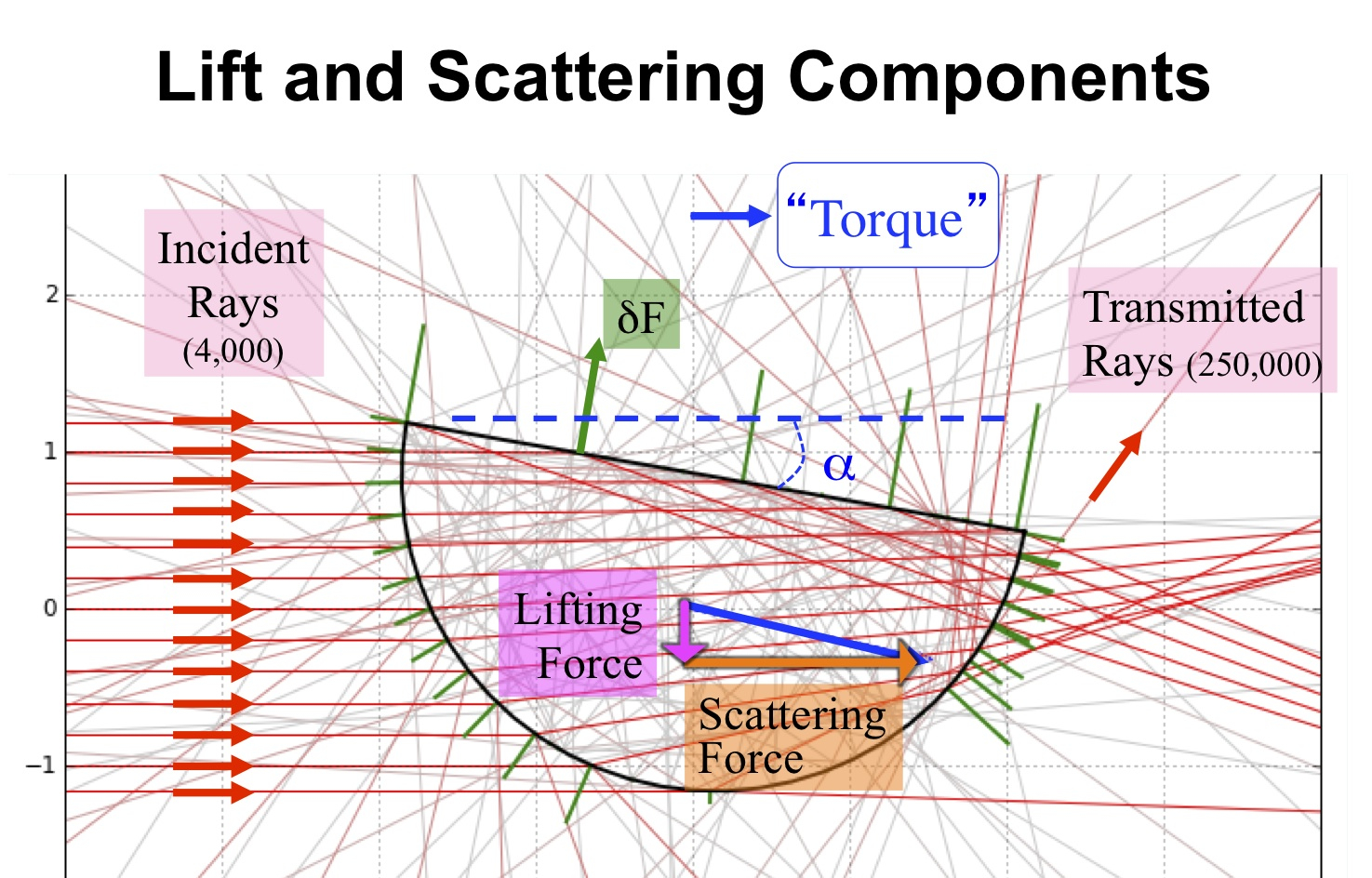
Optical lift is a component of force imparted from uniform light.

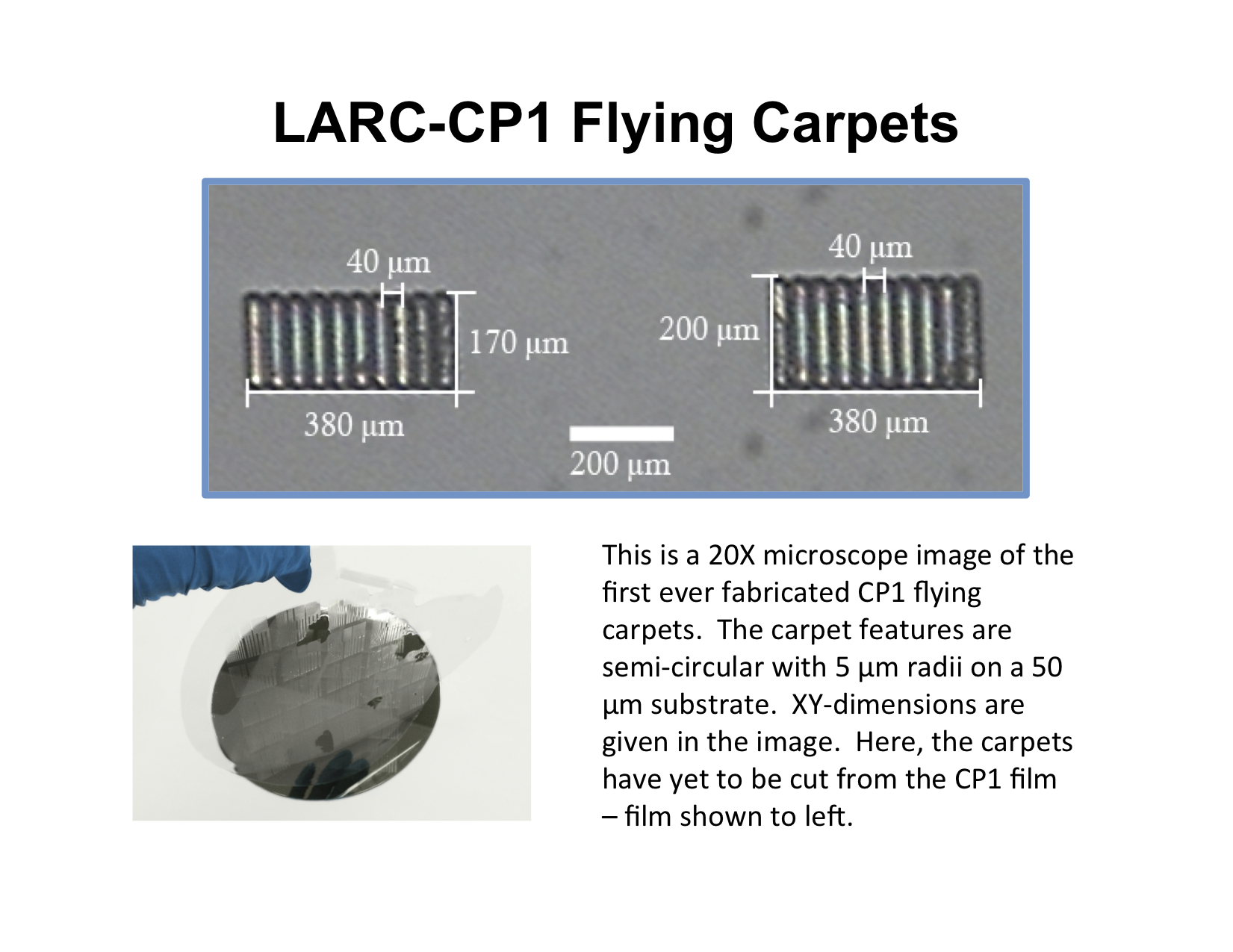
First CP1 fabricated flying carpets

The ability of light to apply pressure to objects is known as radiation pressure, which was first postulated in 1619 and proven in 1900. This is the principle behind the solar sail, which uses light radiation pressure to move through space. A 2010 study by physicist Grover Swartzlander and colleagues of the Rochester Institute of Technology in Rochester, New York shows light is also capable of creating the more complex force of "lift", which is the force generated by airfoils that make an airplane rise upwards as it travels forward. This study was published in December 2010 in Nature Photonics journal. Swartzlander predicted, observed and experimentally verified at a micrometer-scale that when applying a beam of laser light to a semi-cylindrical refractive rod, it automatically torques into a stable angle of attack, and then exhibits uniform motion.

The experiment began as computer models that suggested when light is incident on a tiny object shaped like a wing, a stable lift force is applied to the particle. Then the researchers decided to do physical experiments in the laboratory, and they created tiny, transparent, micrometer-sized rods that were flat on one side and rounded on the other, rather like airplane wings. They immersed the lightfoils in water and bombarded them with 130 mW infrared laser light from underneath the chamber. Radiation pressure pushes the particles along the direction of propagation, this is called the scatter force, but the excitement came when the particles were forced to the side in a direction perpendicular to the direction of propagating light. The transverse force on the particles is the lift force. The researchers discovered not only that the rods experienced stable lift, but that, depending on the refractive index, the rod could have up to two stable angles of attack it rotated to when exposed to the laser light. Symmetrical spheres tested did not exhibit this same lift effect.

In optical lift, created by a "lightfoil", the lift is created within the transparent object as light shines through it and is refracted by its inner surfaces. In the lightfoil rods a greater proportion of light leaves in a direction perpendicular to the beam and this side therefore experiences a larger radiation pressure and hence, lift.

== Potential uses ==
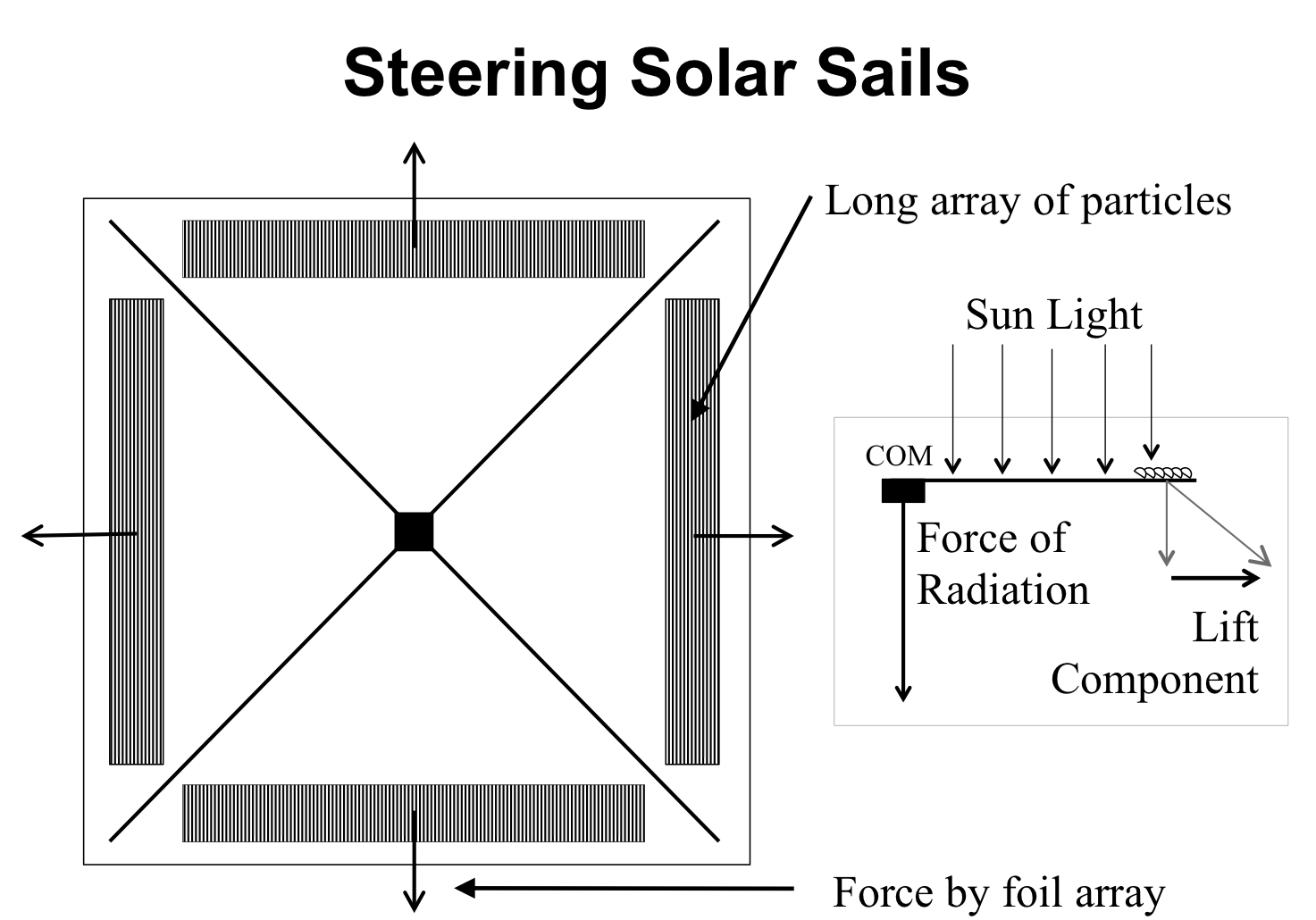
Using optical lift to steer solar sails

The 2010 discovery of stable optical lift is considered by some physicists to be "most surprising". Unlike optical tweezers, an intensity gradient is not required to achieve a transverse force. Many rods may therefore be lifted simultaneously in a single quasi-uniform beam of light. Swartzlander and his team propose using optical lift to power micromachines, transport microscopic particles in a liquid, or to help on self-alignment and steering of solar sails, a form of spacecraft propulsion for interstellar space travel. Solar sails are generally designed to harness light to "push" a spacecraft, whereas Swartzlander designed their lightfoil to lift in a perpendicular direction; this is where the idea of being able to steer a future solar sail spacecraft may be applied.

Swartzlander said the next step would be to test lightfoils in air and experiment with a variety of materials with different refractive properties, and with incoherent light.

== See also ==
- Aerodynamic lift
- IKAROS – (Interplanetary Kite-craft Accelerated by Radiation of the Sun)
- Laser propulsion
- Optical force
- Solar sail
