= Crystal optics =

Sub-branch of Optical Physics

Crystal optics is the branch of optics that describes the behaviour of light in anisotropic media, that is, media (such as crystals) in which light behaves differently depending on which direction the light is propagating. The index of refraction depends on both composition and crystal structure and can be calculated using the Gladstone–Dale relation. Crystals are often naturally anisotropic, and in some media (such as liquid crystals) it is possible to induce anisotropy by applying an external electric field.

== Isotropic media ==
Typical transparent media such as glasses are isotropic, which means that light behaves the same way no matter which direction it is travelling in the medium. In terms of Maxwell's equations in a dielectric, this gives a relationship between the electric displacement field D and the electric field E:

$$\mathbf{D} = \varepsilon_0  \mathbf{E} + \mathbf{P}$$

where ε_{0} is the permittivity of free space and P is the electric polarization (the vector field corresponding to electric dipole moments present in the medium). Physically, the polarization field can be regarded as the response of the medium to the electric field of the light.

=== Electric susceptibility ===
In an isotropic and linear medium, this polarization field P is proportional and parallel to the electric field E:

$$\mathbf{P}  = \chi \varepsilon_0 \mathbf{E}$$

where χ is the electric susceptibility of the medium. The relation between D and E is thus:

$$\mathbf{D}  =   \varepsilon_0 \mathbf{E}  +  \chi \varepsilon_0 \mathbf{E}
=  \varepsilon_0  (1 + \chi)  \mathbf{E}   =  \varepsilon   \mathbf{E}$$

where

$$\varepsilon =  \varepsilon_0  (1 + \chi)$$

is the dielectric constant of the medium. The value 1+χ is called the relative permittivity of the medium, and is related to the refractive index n, for non-magnetic media, by

$$n = \sqrt{ 1 + \chi}$$

== Anisotropic media ==
In an anisotropic medium, such as a crystal, the polarisation field P is not necessarily aligned with the electric field of the light E. In a physical picture, this can be thought of as the dipoles induced in the medium by the electric field having certain preferred directions, related to the physical structure of the crystal. This can be written as:

$$\mathbf{P} = \varepsilon_0 \boldsymbol{\chi} \mathbf{E} .$$

Here χ is not a number as before but a tensor of rank 2, the electric susceptibility tensor. In terms of components in 3 dimensions:

$$\begin{pmatrix} P_x \\ P_y \\ P_z \end{pmatrix} = \varepsilon_0
\begin{pmatrix} \chi_{xx} & \chi_{xy} & \chi_{xz} \\ \chi_{yx} & \chi_{yy} & \chi_{yz} \\ \chi_{zx} & \chi_{zy} & \chi_{zz} \end{pmatrix}
\begin{pmatrix} E_x \\ E_y \\ E_z \end{pmatrix}$$

or using the summation convention:

$$P_i = \varepsilon_0 \sum_{j\in\{x,y,z\}}\chi_{ij} E_j \quad.$$

Since χ is a tensor, P is not necessarily colinear with E.

In nonmagnetic and transparent materials, χ_{ij} = χ_{ji}, i.e. the χ tensor is real and symmetric. In accordance with the spectral theorem, it is thus possible to diagonalise the tensor by choosing the appropriate set of coordinate axes, zeroing all components of the tensor except χ_{xx}, χ_{yy} and χ_{zz}. This gives the set of relations:

$$P_x = \varepsilon_0 \chi_{xx} E_x$$
$$P_y = \varepsilon_0 \chi_{yy} E_y$$
$$P_z = \varepsilon_0 \chi_{zz} E_z$$

The directions x, y and z are in this case known as the principal axes of the medium. Note that these axes will be orthogonal if all entries in the χ tensor are real, corresponding to a case in which the refractive index is real in all directions.

It follows that D and E are also related by a tensor:

$$\mathbf{D} = \varepsilon_0 \mathbf{E} + \mathbf{P} = \varepsilon_0 \mathbf{E} + \varepsilon_0 \boldsymbol{\chi} \mathbf{E} = \varepsilon_0 (I + \boldsymbol{\chi}) \mathbf{E} = \varepsilon_0 \boldsymbol{\varepsilon} \mathbf{E} .$$

Here ε is known as the relative permittivity tensor or dielectric tensor. Consequently, the refractive index of the medium must also be a tensor. Consider a light wave propagating along the z principal axis polarised such the electric field of the wave is parallel to the x-axis. The wave experiences a susceptibility χ_{xx} and a permittivity ε_{xx}. The refractive index is thus:

$$n_{xx} = (1 + \chi_{xx})^{1/2} = (\varepsilon_{xx})^{1/2} .$$

For a wave polarised in the y direction:

$$n_{yy} = (1 + \chi_{yy})^{1/2} = (\varepsilon_{yy})^{1/2} .$$

Thus these waves will see two different refractive indices and travel at different speeds. This phenomenon is known as birefringence and occurs in some common crystals such as calcite and quartz.

If χ_{xx} = χ_{yy} ≠ χ_{zz}, the crystal is known as uniaxial. (See Optic axis of a crystal.) If χ_{xx} ≠ χ_{yy} and χ_{yy} ≠ χ_{zz} the crystal is called biaxial. A uniaxial crystal exhibits two refractive indices, an "ordinary" index (n_{o}) for light polarised in the x or y directions, and an "extraordinary" index (n_{e}) for polarisation in the z direction. A uniaxial crystal is "positive" if n_{e} > n_{o} and "negative" if n_{e} < n_{o}. Light polarised at some angle to the axes will experience a different phase velocity for different polarization components, and cannot be described by a single index of refraction. This is often depicted as an index ellipsoid.

== Other effects ==
Certain nonlinear optical phenomena such as the electro-optic effect cause a variation of a medium's permittivity tensor when an external electric field is applied, proportional (to lowest order) to the strength of the field. This causes a rotation of the principal axes of the medium and alters the behaviour of light travelling through it; the effect can be used to produce light modulators.

In response to a magnetic field, some materials can have a dielectric tensor that is complex-Hermitian; this is called a gyro-magnetic or magneto-optic effect. In this case, the principal axes are complex-valued vectors, corresponding to elliptically polarized light, and time-reversal symmetry can be broken. This can be used to design optical isolators, for example.

A dielectric tensor that is not Hermitian gives rise to complex eigenvalues, which corresponds to a material with gain or absorption at a particular frequency.

== See also ==
- Birefringence
- Optic crystals
- Index ellipsoid
- Optical rotation
- Prism
