= Molar concentration =

Measure of concentration of a chemical

- Common symbols: c, [chemical symbol or formula]
- SI unit: mol/m^{3}
- Other units: mol/L, M
- Derivations from other quantities: c = n/V
- Dimension: $\mathsf{L}^{-3} \mathsf{N}$

Molar concentration (also called amount-of-substance concentration or molarity) is the number of moles of solute per liter of solution. Specifically, it is a measure of the concentration of a chemical species, in particular, of a solute in a solution, in terms of amount of substance per unit volume of solution. In chemistry, the most commonly used unit for molarity is the number of moles per liter, having the unit symbol mol/L or mol/dm^{3} (1000 mol/m^{3}) (really (mol/m^{3})/1000) in SI units. Molar concentration is often depicted with square brackets around the substance of interest; for example, the molarity of the hydronium ion is denoted as [H_{3}O^{+}].

== Definition ==
Molar concentration, or molarity, is most commonly expressed in units of moles of solute per litre of solution. For use in broader applications, it is defined as amount of substance of solute per unit volume of solution, or per unit volume available to the species, represented by lowercase $c$:

$$c = \frac{n}{V} = \frac{N}{N_\text{A}\,V} = \frac{C}{N_\text{A}}.$$

Here, $n$ is the amount of the solute in moles, $N$ is the number of constituent particles present in volume $V$ (in litres) of the solution, and $N_\text{A}$ is the Avogadro constant, since 2019 defined as exactly 6.02214076×10^{23} mol^{−1}. The ratio ${N}/{V}$ is the number density $C$.

In thermodynamics, the use of molar concentration is often not convenient because the volume of most solutions slightly depends on temperature due to thermal expansion. This problem is usually resolved by introducing temperature correction factors, or by using a temperature-independent measure of concentration such as molality.

The reciprocal quantity represents the dilution (volume) which can appear in Ostwald's law of dilution.

=== Formality or analytical concentration ===
If a molecule or salt dissociates in solution, the concentration refers to the original chemical formula in solution, the molar concentration is sometimes called formal concentration or formality (F_{A}) or analytical concentration (c_{A}). For example, if a sodium carbonate solution (Na_{2}CO_{3}) has a formal concentration of c(Na_{2}CO_{3}) = 1 mol/L, the molar concentrations are c(Na^{+}) = 2 mol/L and c(CO^{2−}_{3}) = 1 mol/L because the salt dissociates into these ions.

== Units ==
While there is clear consensus on the equivalence of units:

1 mol/m^{3} = 10^{−3} mol/dm^{3} = 10^{−3} mol/L = 10^{−3} M = 1 mM = 1 mmol/L,

guidance on unit names and abbreviations varies:

[A]mount concentration ... [a]lso called amount-of-substance concentration, substance concentration (in clinical chemistry) and in older literature molarity. ...The common unit is mole per cubic decimetre (mol dm^{−3}) or mole per litre (mol L^{−1}) sometimes denoted by M.

— IUPAC, "Gold Book" 5ed

In the older literature this quantity was often called molarity, a usage that should be avoided due to the risk of confusion with the quantity molality. Units commonly used for amount concentration are mol L^{−1} (or mol dm^{−3}), mmol L^{−1}, mmol L^{−1} etc., often denoted M, mM, μM etc. (pronounced molar, millimolar, micromolar).

— IUPAC, "Green Book" 3ed

The term molarity and the symbol M should no longer be used because they, too, are obsolete. One should use instead amount-of-substance concentration of B and such units as mol/dm^{3}, kmol/m^{3}, or mol/L. (A solution of, for example, 0.1 mol/dm^{3} was often called a 0.1 molar solution, denoted 0.1 M solution. The molarity of the solution was said to be 0.1 M.)

— NIST, Guide to the SI, Chapter 8

The SI prefix "mega" (symbol M) has the same symbol. However, the prefix is never used alone, so "M" unambiguously denotes molar. Sub-multiples, such as "millimolar" (mM) and "nanomolar" (nM), consist of the unit preceded by an SI prefix:

Name	Abbre- viation	Concentration		Number of particles	
Name	Abbre- viation	(mol/L)	(mol/m^{3})	per L	per m^{3}
millimolar	mM	10^{−3}	10^{0} = 1	~6×10^{20}	~6×10^{23}
micromolar	μM	10^{−6}	10^{−3}	~6×10^{17}	~6×10^{20}
nanomolar	nM	10^{−9}	10^{−6}	~6×10^{14}	~6×10^{17}
picomolar	pM	10^{−12}	10^{−9}	~6×10^{11}	~6×10^{14}
femtomolar	fM	10^{−15}	10^{−12}	~6×10^{8}	~6×10^{11}
attomolar	aM	10^{−18}	10^{−15}	~6×10^{5}	~6×10^{8}
zeptomolar	zM	10^{−21}	10^{−18}	~600	~6×10^{5}
yoctomolar	yM	10^{−24}	10^{−21}	~0.6	~600
rontomolar	rM	10^{−27}	10^{−24}	~6×10^{−4}	~0.6
quectomolar	qM	10^{−30}	10^{−27}	~6×10^{−7}	~6×10^{−4}

== Related quantities ==
=== Number concentration ===
The conversion to number concentration $C_i$ is given by

$$C_i = c_i N_\text{A},$$

where $N_\text{A}$ is the Avogadro constant.

=== Mass concentration ===
The conversion to mass concentration $\rho_i$ is given by

$$\rho_i = c_i M_i,$$

where $M_i$ is the molar mass of constituent $i$.

=== Mole fraction ===
The conversion to mole fraction $x_i$ is given by

$$x_i = c_i \frac{\overline{M}}{\rho},$$

where $\overline{M}$ is the average molar mass of the solution, $\rho$ is the density of the solution.

A simpler relation can be obtained by considering the total molar concentration, namely, the sum of molar concentrations of all the components of the mixture:

$$x_i = \frac{c_i}{c} = \frac{c_i}{\sum_j c_j}.$$

=== Mass fraction ===
The conversion to mass fraction $w_i$ is given by

$$w_i = c_i \frac{M_i}{\rho}.$$

=== Molality ===
For binary mixtures, the conversion to molality $b_2$ is

$$b_2 = \frac{c_2}{\rho - c_1 M_1},$$

where the solvent is substance 1, and the solute is substance 2.

For solutions with more than one solute, the conversion is

$$b_i = \frac{c_i}{\rho - \sum_{j\neq i} c_j M_j}.$$

== Properties ==
=== Sum of molar concentrations – normalizing relations ===
The sum of molar concentrations gives the total molar concentration, namely the density of the mixture divided by the molar mass of the mixture or by another name the reciprocal of the molar volume of the mixture. In an ionic solution, ionic strength is proportional to the sum of the molar concentration of salts.

=== Sum of products of molar concentrations and partial molar volumes ===
The sum of products between these quantities equals one:

$$\sum_i c_i \overline{V_i} = 1.$$

=== Dependence on volume ===
The molar concentration depends on the variation of the volume of the solution due mainly to thermal expansion. On small intervals of temperature, the dependence is

$$c_i = \frac {c_{i,T_0}}{1 + \alpha\Delta T},$$

where $c_{i,T_0}$ is the molar concentration at a reference temperature, $\alpha$ is the thermal expansion coefficient of the mixture.

== Examples ==
- 11.6 g of NaCl is dissolved in 100 g of water. The final mass concentration ρ(NaCl) is
  ρ(NaCl) = (11.6 g)/(11.6 g + 100 g) = 0.104 g/g = 10.4 %.
  The volume of such a solution is 104.3mL (volume is directly observable); its density is calculated to be 1.07 (111.6g/104.3mL)
  The molar concentration of NaCl in the solution is therefore
  c(NaCl) = (11.6 g)/(58 g/mol) / 104.3 mL = 0.00192 mol/mL = 1.92 mol/L.
  Here, 58 g/mol is the molar mass of NaCl.
- A typical task in chemistry is the preparation of 100 mL (= 0.1 L) of a 2 mol/L solution of NaCl in water. The mass of salt needed is
  m(NaCl) = 2 mol/L × 0.1 L × 58 g/mol = 11.6 g.
  To create the solution, 11.6 g NaCl is placed in a volumetric flask, dissolved in some water, then followed by the addition of more water until the total volume reaches 100 mL.
- The density of water is approximately 1000 g/L and its molar mass is 18.02 g/mol (or 1/18.02 = 0.055 mol/g). Therefore, the molar concentration of water is
  c(H_{2}O) = (1000 g/L)/(18.02 g/mol) ≈ 55.5 mol/L.
  Likewise, the concentration of solid hydrogen (molar mass = 2.02 g/mol) is
  c(H_{2}) = (88 g/L)/(2.02 g/mol) = 43.7 mol/L.
  The concentration of pure osmium tetroxide (molar mass = 254.23 g/mol) is
  c(OsO_{4}) = (5.1 kg/L)/(254.23 g/mol) = 20.1 mol/L.
- A typical protein in bacteria, such as E. coli, may have about 60 copies, and the volume of a bacterium is about 10^{−15} L. Thus, the number concentration C is
  C = 60 / (10^{−15} L) = 6×10^{16} L^{−1}.
  The molar concentration is
  c = C/N_{A} = (6×10^{16} L^{−1})/(6×10^{23} mol^{−1}) = 10^{−7} mol/L = 100 nmol/L.
- Reference ranges for blood tests, sorted by molar concentration:
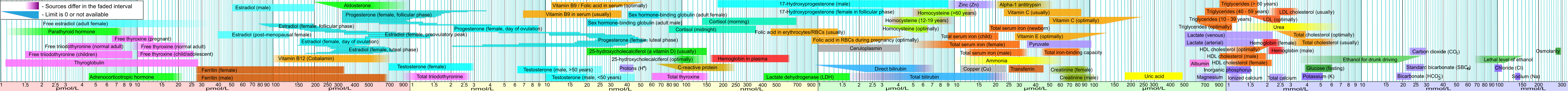

== See also ==
- Molality
- Normality
- Orders of magnitude (molar concentration)
