= Orders of magnitude (current) =

Comparison of a wide range of electric currents

To help compare different orders of magnitude, the following list describes various amounts of electric current.

Factor (ampere)	Value	Item
10^{−19}	160 zA	One electron per second
10^{−12}	1-15 pA	Range of currents associated with single ion channels [calcium (1 pA), sodium (10-14 pA), potassium (6 pA)] as measured by patch-clamp studies of biological membranes
10^{−5}	10 μA	Minimum current necessary to cause death (by ventricular fibrillation when applied directly across the human heart)
10^{−4}	700 μA	Portable hearing aid (typically 1 mW at 1.4 V)
10^{−3}	1 – 5 mA	Cathode ray tube electron gun beam current
10^{−2}	10 mA	Through the hand to foot may cause a person to freeze and be unable to let go
10^{−2}	20 mA	Common light-emitting diode (constant current); also deadly limit for skin contact (at 120–230 V)
10^{−2}	80 mA	Upper limit for TENS modeled for 500 Ω
10^{−1}	150 mA	230 V AC, 22-inch/56-centimeter portable television (35 W)
10^{−1}	166 mA	Typical 12 V motor vehicle instrument panel light
10^{−1}	250 – 450 mA	230 V AC Tungsten incandescent light bulb (60–100 W)
10^{−1}	290 mA	120 V AC, 22-inch/56-centimeter portable television (35 W)
10^{−1}	500 – 830 mA	120 V AC Tungsten incandescent light bulb (60–100 W)
10^{0}	1 A	Current flow of 10^{19} elementary charges every 1.602176634 seconds
10^{0}	1 A	Typical iPhone charger (5 W)
10^{0}	1.35 A	Tesla coil, 0.76 meters (2.5 ft) high, at 200 kV and 270 kV peak
10^{0}	2.1 A	High power LED current (peak 2.7 A)
10^{0}	5 A	One typical 12 V motor vehicle headlight (typically 60 W)
10^{0}	9 A	230 V AC, toaster, kettle (2 kW)
10^{1}	10 or 20 A	230 V AC, Europe common domestic circuit breaker rating
10^{1}	15 or 20 A	120 V AC, United States, Canada and Mexico domestic circuit breaker rating
10^{1}	16.6 A	120 V AC, toaster, kettle (2 kW)
10^{1}	20 A	230 V AC, Immersion heater (4.6 kW)
10^{1}	24 A	12V DC, PC, High-performance graphics card (288W)
10^{1}	38.3 A	120 V AC, Immersion heater (4.6 kW)
10^{2}	80–160 A	Typical 12 V motor vehicle starter motor (typically 1–2 kW)
10^{2}	80–375 A	TIG welding arc
10^{2}	166 A	400 V low voltage secondary side distribution transformer with primary 12 kV; 200 kVA (up to 1000 kVA also common)
10^{3}	2 kA	10.5 kV secondary side from an electrical substation with primary 115 kV; 63 MVA
10^{3}	9.3 kA	2.7V, Ultracapacitor short circuit current
10^{4}	25 kA	Lorentz force can crusher pinch
10^{4}	30 kA	Typical lightning strike
10^{5}	100 kA	Low range of Birkeland current that creates Earth's aurorae
10^{5}	140 kA	"Sq" current of one daytime vortex within the ionospheric dynamo region
10^{5}	180 kA	Typical current used in electric arc furnace for ferroalloys
10^{6}	1 MA	High range of Birkeland current
10^{6}	5 MA	Flux tube between Jupiter and Io (moon)
10^{6}	26 MA	Sandia National Laboratories, Z machine approximate firing current since 2007
10^{6}	256 MA	VNIIEF laboratories (Russia) current produced in explosive flux compression generator
10^{9}	3 GA	Total current in the Sun's heliospheric current sheet
10^{18}	3 EA	Current of 2 kpc segment of 50 kpc-long radio jet of the Seyfert galaxy 3C 303
