= Optical downconverter =

Optical DownConverter (ODC) is an example of a non-linear optical process, in which two beams of light of different frequencies $\omega_1$ and $\omega_2$ interact, creating microwave with frequency $\omega_3 = \omega_1 - \omega_2$. It is a generalization of microwave. In the latter, $\omega_1 = \omega_2$, both of which can be provided by a single light source. From a quantum mechanical perspective, ODC can be seen as result of differencing two photons to produce a microwave. Since the energy of a photon is given by

$E_\nu = \hbar\omega,$

the frequency summing $\omega_3 = \omega_1 - \omega_2$ is simply a statement that energy is conserved.

In a common ODC application, light from a tunable infrared laser is combined with light from a fixed frequency visible laser to produce a microwave created by a wave mixing process.

The ODC use millimetric microwave cavity that include photonic crystal that provide by two signal frequency light source. The microwave is detected by the cavity antenna.

== See also ==
- Sum-frequency generation
- Homodyne detection
