= Organic nonlinear optical materials =

Organic materials are expected to have relatively strong nonlinear optical properties due to delocalized electrons at $\pi-\pi$* orbitals. This expectation explains the extensive search for better NLO materials among organic crystals.

== L-arginine maleate dihydrate ==
L-arginine is one of the essential amino acids widely distributed in biological substances. It forms a number of salts with organic and inorganic acids showing non-linear optical properties. L-Arginine maleate dihydrate (C_{6}H_{14}N_{4}O_{2},C_{4}H_{4}O_{4},2H_{2}O) is one of these L-arginine salts which is a complex of strongly basic amino acid, carboxylic acid and provides useful information in relation to molecular interaction in present-day biological systems and to prebiotic self-organisms. It is also a nonlinear optical material with a second-harmonic generation efficiency 1.68 times that of KDP. L-arginine maleate dihydrate crystals are grown from solution by solvent evaporation; they belong to the triclinic space group P1.

== L-methionine L-methioninium hydrogen maleate ==
L-methionine L-methioninium hydrogen maleate also belongs to the amino acid family. Crystals are grown by slow evaporation of an aqueous solution containing L-methionine and maleic acid, resulting in centimeter-large crystals of a non-centrosymmetric space group. They were applied for second-harmonic generation (SHG) of an Nd:YAG laser (wavelength 1064 nm), and SHG efficiency equal to that of KDP has been obtained.
