= 3C 303 =

Seyfert galaxy

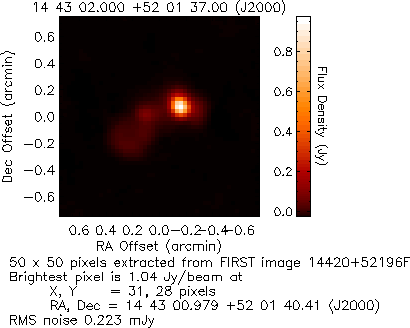

Observation data (Epoch J2000)
- Constellation: Boötes
- Right ascension: 14^{h} 43^{m} 02.76070^{s}
- Declination: +52° 01′ 37.2982″
- Redshift: 0.141186
- Distance: 564 megaparsecs (1.84×10^{9} ly) h^{−1}_{0.73}
- Type: Sy1, Rad, AGN, IR, X, AG?, QSO, G G, FR II, Sy 1.5
- Apparent magnitude (V): 18.29

Other designations
- DA 369, 3C 303, QSO B1441+5214

3C 303 is a Seyfert galaxy with a quasar-like appearance located in the constellation Boötes.

3C 303 is also a radio galaxy It also contains an extragalactic radio source. A clear defined jet is also seen, showing a polarization variation trend. With a diffuse patch of optical emission located at the intersection of the jet where a radio lobe is connected, the jet is confirmed to target a region of interstellar medium.
