= Okorokov effect =

The Okorokov effect (Russian: эффект Окорокова), also known as resonant coherent excitation, is a phenomenon observed when heavy ions move through crystals under channeling conditions. It occurs when ions travel along specific crystallographic planes or axes, allowing them to interact coherently with the periodic electric field of the crystal lattice. V. Okorokov predicted this effect in 1965 and it was first observed by Sheldon Datz in 1978.

The Okorokov effect is expected to find use in a number of applications, including the measurement of spectroscopic characteristics of multiply charged ions, which is a pertinent in connection to astrophysics and quantum physics.
