= Orders of magnitude (molar concentration) =

Comparison of a wide range of molar concentrations

This page lists examples of the orders of magnitude of molar concentration. Source values are parenthesized where unit conversions were performed.

M denotes the non-SI unit molar:

1 M = 1 mol/L = 10^{3} mol/m^{3}.

== All orders ==
List of orders of magnitude for molar concentration
Factor (Molarity)	SI prefix	Value	Item
10^{−24}	yM	1.66 yM	1 elementary entity per litre
10^{−24}	yM	8.5 yM	airborne bacteria in the upper troposphere (5100/m^{3})
10^{−23}	yM		
10^{−22}	yM		
10^{−21}	zM	3.6 zM	solar neutrinos on Earth (6.5×10^{10} /cm^{2}⋅s)
10^{−20}	zM	12 zM	radon in ambient, outdoor air in the United States (0.4 pCi/L ≈ 7000/L)
10^{−19}	zM	120 zM	indoor radon at the EPA's "action level" (4 pCi/L ≈ 70000/L)
10^{−19}	zM	686 zM	cosmic microwave background photons in outer space (413/cm^{3})
10^{−18}	aM		
10^{−17}	aM		
10^{−16}	aM		
10^{−15}	fM	2 fM	bacteria in surface seawater (1×10^{9}/L)
10^{−14}	fM	20 fM	virions in surface layer North Atlantic seawater (10×10^{9}/L)
10^{−14}	fM	50–100 fM	gold in seawater
10^{−13}	fM		
10^{−12}	pM	7.51–9.80 pM	normal range for erythrocytes in blood in an adult male ((4.52–5.90)×10^{12}/L)
10^{−11}	pM	10–100 pM	gold in undersea hydrothermal fluids
10^{−10}	pM	170 pM	upper bound for healthy insulin when fasting
10^{−9}	nM	5 nM	inhaled osmium tetroxide is immediately dangerous to life or health (1 mg Os/m^{3})
10^{−8}	nM		
10^{−7}	nM	101 nM	hydronium and hydroxide ions in pure water at 25 °C (pK_{W} = 13.99)
10^{−6}	μM		
10^{−5}	μM		
10^{−4}	μM	180–480 μM	normal range for uric acid in blood
10^{−4}	μM	570 μM	inhaled carbon monoxide induces unconsciousness in 2–3 breaths and death in < 3 min (12800 ppm)
10^{−3}	mM	0.32–32 mM	normal range of hydronium ions in stomach acid (pH 1.5–3.5)
10^{−3}	mM	5.5 mM	upper bound for healthy blood glucose when fasting
10^{−3}	mM	7.8 mM	upper bound for healthy blood glucose 2 hours after eating
10^{−2}	cM	20 mM	neutrinos during a supernova, 1 AU from the core (10^{58} over 10 s)
10^{−2}	cM	44.6 mM	pure ideal gas at 0 °C and 101.325 kPa
10^{−1}	dM	140 mM	sodium ions in blood plasma
10^{−1}	dM	480 mM	sodium ions in seawater
10^{0}	M	1 M	standard state concentration for defining thermodynamic activity
10^{1}	daM	17.5 M	pure (glacial) acetic acid (1.05 g/cm^{3})
10^{1}	daM	40 M	pure solid hydrogen (86 g/L)
10^{1}	daM	55.5 M	pure water at 3.984 °C, temperature of its maximum density (1.0000 g/cm^{3})
10^{2}	hM	118.8 M	pure osmium at 20 °C (22.587 g/cm^{3})
10^{2}	hM	140.5 M	pure copper at 25 °C (8.93 g/cm^{3})
10^{3}	kM		
10^{4}	kM	24 kM	helium in the solar core (150 g/cm^{3} ⋅ 65%)
10^{5}	kM		
10^{6}	MM		
10^{7}	MM		
10^{8}	MM	122.2 MM	nuclei in a white dwarf from a 3 M_{☉} progenitor star (10^{6.349} g/cm^{3})
10^{9}	GM		
10^{10}	GM		
10^{11}	GM		
10^{12}	TM		
10^{13}	TM		
10^{14}	TM		
10^{15}	PM		
10^{16}	PM		
10^{17}	PM	228 PM	nucleons in atomic nuclei (2.3×10^{17} kg/m^{3} = 1.37×10^{44}/m^{3})
10^{18}	EM		
...			
10^{77}		3.9×10^{77} M	the Planck concentration (2.4×10^{104}/m^{3}), inverse of the Planck volume

== SI multiples ==
SI multiples of molar (M)
Submultiples			Multiples		
Value	SI symbol	Name	Value	SI symbol	Name
10^{−1} M	dM	decimolar	10^{1} M	daM	decamolar
10^{−2} M	cM	centimolar	10^{2} M	hM	hectomolar
10^{−3} M	mM	millimolar	10^{3} M	kM	kilomolar
10^{−6} M	μM	micromolar	10^{6} M	MM	megamolar
10^{−9} M	nM	nanomolar	10^{9} M	GM	gigamolar
10^{−12} M	pM	picomolar	10^{12} M	TM	teramolar
10^{−15} M	fM	femtomolar	10^{15} M	PM	petamolar
10^{−18} M	aM	attomolar	10^{18} M	EM	examolar
10^{−21} M	zM	zeptomolar	10^{21} M	ZM	zettamolar
10^{−24} M	yM	yoctomolar	10^{24} M	YM	yottamolar
10^{−27} M	rM	rontomolar	10^{27} M	RM	ronnamolar
10^{−30} M	qM	quectomolar	10^{30} M	QM	quettamolar

== See also ==
- Molarity
- Osmolarity
- Metric system
- Scientific notation
