= Oleg Sushkov =

Australian nuclear physicist

Oleg Sushkov is a professor at the University of New South Wales and a leader in the field of high temperature super-conductors. Educated in Russia in quantum mechanics and nuclear physics, he now teaches in Australia.

== Education ==
- 1974 MSc, Novosibirsk State University, Russia
- 1978 PhD in physics, Budker Institute of Nuclear Physics, Novosibirsk, Russia
- 1984 Doctor of Science (Habilitation), Budker Institute of Nuclear Physics, Novosibirsk, Russia

== Awards and recognition ==
- Australian Research Council Professorial Fellow, 2011 - 2015, University of New South Wales
- Alexander von Humbold Research Award (Germany), 2006
- Lenin Komsomol State Prize in Science (Soviet Union), 1982

== Selected publications ==
As of January 2022, Google Scholar estimates that Sushkov's h-index is 53.

- Sushkov, O. P.; Kotov, V. N. (31 August 1998). "Bound States of Magnons in the S=1/2 Quantum Spin Ladder". Physical Review Letters. 81 (9). American Physical Society (APS): 1941–1944. arXiv:cond-mat/9803180. Bibcode:1998PhRvL..81.1941S. doi:10.1103/physrevlett.81.1941. ISSN 0031-9007. S2CID 119477768.
- Sushkov, O. P.; Oitmaa, J.; Weihong, Zheng (20 February 2001). "Quantum phase transitions in the two-dimensional J1−J2 model". Physical Review B. 63 (10) 104420. American Physical Society (APS). arXiv:cond-mat/0007329. Bibcode:2001PhRvB..63j4420S. doi:10.1103/physrevb.63.104420. ISSN 0163-1829. S2CID 118430095.
- Sushkov, O. (2001). "Conductance anomalies in a one-dimensional quantum contact". Physical Review B. 64 (15) 155319. American Physical Society (APS). arXiv:cond-mat/0104006. Bibcode:2001PhRvB..64o5319S. doi:10.1103/physrevb.64.155319. ISSN 0163-1829. S2CID 119519796.
- Kuenzi, S. A.; Sushkov, O. P.; Dzuba, V. A.; Cadogan, J. M. (23 September 2002). "Search for violation of fundamental time-reversal and space-reflection symmetries in solid-state experiments". Physical Review A. 66 (3) 032111. American Physical Society (APS). arXiv:cond-mat/0205113. Bibcode:2002PhRvA..66c2111K. doi:10.1103/physreva.66.032111. ISSN 1050-2947. S2CID 119433098.
- Milstein, A. I.; Sushkov, O. P.; Terekhov, I. S. (31 December 2002). "Radiative Corrections and Parity Nonconservation in Heavy Atoms". Physical Review Letters. 89 (28) 283003. arXiv:hep-ph/0208227. Bibcode:2002PhRvL..89B3003M. doi:10.1103/physrevlett.89.283003. ISSN 0031-9007. PMID 12513140. S2CID 36449469.
