= Optic crystals =

Crystals used in fiber optics

Optic crystals are crystals that can be used to direct a beam of light.

Optic crystals can work as directional guides to the light in photonic devices.

Opticmechanics deals with the grinding, polishing and refining of optic crystals.

== See also ==
- Crystal optics
- Electro-optic modulator
- Photonic integrated circuit
