= Orders of magnitude (data) =

Computer data measurements and scales

The order of magnitude of data may be specified in strictly standards-conformant units of information and multiples of the bit and byte with decimal scaling, or using historically common usages of a few multiplier prefixes in a binary interpretation which has been common in computing until new binary prefixes were defined in the 1990s.

== Units of measure ==
The byte has been a commonly used unit of measure for much of the information age to refer to a number of bits. In the early days of computing, it was used for differing numbers of bits based on convention and computer hardware design, but today means 8 bits. A more accurate, but less commonly used name for 8 bits is octet.

Commonly, a decimal SI metric prefix (such as kilo-) is used with bit and byte to express larger sizes (kilobit, kilobyte). But, this is usually inaccurate since these prefixes are decimal, whereas binary hardware size is usually binary. Customarily, each metric prefix, 1000^{n}, is used to mean a close approximation of a binary multiple, 1024^{n}. Often, this distinction is implicit, and therefore, use of metric prefixes can lead to confusion. The IEC binary prefixes (such as kibi-) allow for accurate description of hardware sizes, but are not commonly used.

== Entropy ==
This page references two kinds of entropy which are not entirely equivalent. For comparison, the Avogadro constant is 6.02214076×10^{23} entities per mole, based upon the number of atoms in 12 grams of carbon-12 isotope. See Entropy in thermodynamics and information theory.

- Entropy (information theory), such as the amount of information that can be stored in DNA
- Entropy (thermodynamics), such as entropy increase of 1 mole of water

== List ==
Binary (bits)		Decimal		Item
Factor	Term	Factor	Term	Item
2^{−1}		10^{−1}		0.415 bits (log_{2} 4/3) – amount of information needed to eliminate one option out of four.
				0.6–1.3 bits – approximate information per letter of English text.
2^{0}	bit	10^{0}	bit	1 bit – 0 or 1, false or true, Low or High (a.k.a. unibit)
				1.442695 bits (log_{2} e) – approximate size of a nat (a unit of information based on natural logarithms)
				1.5849625 bits (log_{2} 3) – approximate size of a trit (a base-3 digit)
2^{1}				2 bits – a crumb (a.k.a. dibit) enough to uniquely identify one base pair of DNA
				3 bits – a triad(e), (a.k.a. tribit) the size of an octal digit
2^{2}	nibble			4 bits – (a.k.a. tetrad(e), nibble, quadbit, semioctet, or halfbyte) the size of a hexadecimal digit; decimal digits in binary-coded decimal form
				5 bits – the size of code points in the Baudot code, used in telex communication (a.k.a. pentad)
				6 bits – the size of code points in Univac Fieldata, in IBM "BCD" format, and in Braille. Enough to uniquely identify one codon of genetic code. The size of code points in Base64; thus, often the entropy per character in a randomly-generated password.
				7 bits – the size of code points in the ASCII character set – minimum length to store 2 decimal digits
2^{3}	byte (B)			8 bits – (a.k.a. octet or octad(e)) on many computer architectures. – equivalent to 1 "word" on 8-bit computers (Apple II, Atari 8-bit computers, Commodore 64, etc.). – the "word size" for 8-bit console systems including: Atari 2600, Nintendo Entertainment System
		10^{1}	decabit	10 bits – minimum bit length to store a single byte with error-correcting computer memory – minimum frame length to transmit a single byte with asynchronous serial protocols
				12 bits – wordlength of the PDP-8 of Digital Equipment Corporation (built from 1965 to 1990)
2^{4}				16 bits – the Basic Multilingual Plane of Unicode, containing character codings for almost all modern languages, and a large number of symbols – the basic unit in UTF-16; the full Universal Character Set (Unicode) can be encoded in one or two of these – commonly used in many programming languages, the size of an integer capable of holding 65,536 different values – equivalent to 1 "word" on 16-bit computers (IBM PC, Commodore Amiga) – the "word size" for 16-bit console systems including: Sega Genesis, Super Nintendo, Mattel Intellivision
2^{5}				32 bits (4 bytes) – size of an integer capable of holding 4,294,967,296 different values – size of an IEEE 754 single-precision floating point number – size of addresses in IPv4, the current Internet Protocol – equivalent to 1 "word" on 32-bit processors, including those for the Apple Macintosh, Pentium-based PC, PlayStation, GameCube, Xbox, Wii
				36 bits – size of word on Univac 1100-series computers and Digital Equipment Corporation's PDP-10
				56 bits (7 bytes) – cipher strength of the DES encryption standard
2^{6}				64 bits (8 bytes) – size of an integer capable of holding 18,446,744,073,709,551,616 different values – size of an IEEE 754 double-precision floating point number – equivalent to 1 "word" on 64-bit computers (Power, PA-RISC, Alpha, Itanium, SPARC, x86-64 PCs and Macintoshes). – the "word size" for 64-bit console systems including: Nintendo 64, PlayStation 2, PlayStation 3, Xbox 360
				80 bits (10 bytes) – size of an extended precision floating point number, for intermediate calculations that can be performed in floating point units of most processors of the x86 family.
		10^{2}	hectobit	100 bits
2^{7}				128 bits (16 bytes) – size of addresses in IPv6, the successor protocol of IPv4 – minimum cipher strength of the Rijndael and AES encryption standards, and of the widely used MD5 cryptographic message digest algorithm – size of an SSE vector register, included as part of the x86-64 standard
				160 bits (20 bytes) – maximum key length of the SHA-1, standard Tiger (hash function), and Tiger2 cryptographic message digest algorithms
2^{8}				256 bits (32 bytes) – minimum key length for the recommended strong cryptographic message digests as of 2004 – size of an AVX2 vector register, present on newer x86-64 CPUs
2^{9}				512 bits (64 bytes) – maximum key length for the standard strong cryptographic message digests in 2004 – size of an AVX-512 vector register, present on some x86-64 CPUs
		10^{3}	kilobit (kbit)	1,000 bits (125 bytes)
2^{10}	kibibit (Kibit)			1,024 bits (128 bytes) - RAM capacity of the Atari 2600
				1,288 bits (161 bytes) – approximate maximum capacity of a standard magnetic stripe card
2^{11}				2,048 bits (256 bytes) – RAM capacity of the stock Altair 8800
2^{12}				4,096 bits (512 bytes) – typical sector size, and minimum space allocation unit on computer storage volumes, with most file systems – approximate amount of information on a sheet of single-spaced typewritten paper (without formatting)
				4,704 bits (588 bytes) – uncompressed single-channel frame length in standard MPEG audio (75 frames per second and per channel), with medium quality 8-bit sampling at 44,100 Hz (or 16-bit sampling at 22,050 Hz)
			kilobyte (kB, KB)	8,000 bits (1,000 bytes)
2^{13}	kibibyte (KiB)			8,192 bits (1,024 bytes) – RAM capacity of a ZX81 and a ZX80.
				9,408 bits (1,176 bytes) – uncompressed single-channel frame length in standard MPEG audio (75 frames per second and per channel), with standard 16-bit sampling at 44,100 Hz
		10^{4}		15,360 bits – one screen of data displayed on an 8-bit monochrome text console (80x24)
2^{14}				16,384 bits (2 kibibytes) – one page of typed text, RAM capacity of Nintendo Entertainment System
2^{15}				32,768 bits (4 kibibytes)
2^{16}				65,536 bits (8 kibibytes)
		10^{5}		100,000 bits
2^{17}				131,072 bits (16 kibibytes) – RAM capacity of the smallest ZX Spectrum.
2^{18}				262,144 bits (32 kibibytes) - RAM capacity of Matra Alice 90
				393,216 bits (48 kibibytes) - RAM capacity of 48K ZX Spectrum
				506 kilobits – approximate size of this article as of 20 May 2019
2^{19}				524,288 bits (64 kibibytes) – RAM capacity of popular 8-bit computers like the C-64, Amstrad CPC etc.
		10^{6}	megabit (Mbit)	1,000,000 bits
2^{20}	mebibit (Mibit)			1,048,576 bits (128 kibibytes) – RAM capacity of popular 8-bit computers like the C-128, Amstrad CPC etc. Or a 1024 x 768 pixel JPEG image.
				1,978,560 bits – a one-page, standard-resolution black-and-white fax (1728 × 1145 pixels)
2^{21}				2,097,152 bits (256 kibibytes)
				4,147,200 bits – one frame of uncompressed NTSC DVD video (720 × 480 × 12 bpp Y'CbCr)
2^{22}				4,194,304 bits (512 kibibytes)
				4,976,640 bits – one frame of uncompressed PAL DVD video (720 × 576 × 12 bpp Y'CbCr)
				5,000,000 bits – Typical English book volume in plain text format of 500 pages × 2000 characters per page and 5-bits per character.
				5,242,880 bits (640 kibibytes) – the maximum addressable memory of the original IBM PC architecture
			megabyte (MB)	8,000,000 bits (1,000 kilobytes) – the preferred definition of megabyte
				8,343,400 bits – one "typical" sized photograph with reasonably good quality (1024 × 768 pixels).
2^{23}	mebibyte (MiB)			8,388,608 bits (1,024 kibibytes), one of a few traditional meanings of megabyte
		10^{7}		11,520,000 bits – capacity of a lower-resolution computer monitor (as of 2006), 800 × 600 pixels, 24 bpp
				11,796,480 bits – capacity of a 3.5 in floppy disk, colloquially known as 1.44 megabyte but actually 1.44 × 1000 × 1024 bytes
2^{24}				
2^{24}				16,777,216 bits (2 mebibytes)
2^{24}				25,000,000 bits – amount of data in a typical color slide
				30,000,000 bits – The first commercial harddisk IBM 350 in 1956 could store 3.75 MiB for a cost of US$50,000, equivalent to $592,105 in 2025.
2^{25}				33,554,432 bits (4 mebibytes) – RAM capacity of stock Nintendo 64 and average size of a music track in MP3 format.
				41,943,040 bits (5 mebibytes) – approximate size of the Complete Works of Shakespeare
				80,000,000 bits – In 1985 a 10 MB harddisk cost US$710, equivalent to $2,125 in 2025.
				98,304,000 bits – capacity of a high-resolution computer monitor as of 2011, 2560 × 1600 pixels, 24 bpp
				50 – 100 megabits – amount of information in a typical phone book
2^{26}		10^{8}		67,108,864 bit (8 mebibytes)
2^{27}				134,217,728 bits (16 mebibytes)
				150 megabits – amount of data in a large foldout map
2^{28}				268,435,456 bits (32 mebibytes)
				144,000,000 bits: In 1980 an 18 MB hard disk cost US$4,199, equivalent to $16,408 in 2025.
				423,360,000 bits: a five-minute audio recording, in CDDA quality
2^{29}				536,870,912 bits (64 mebibytes)
		10^{9}	gigabit (Gbit)	1,000,000,000 bits
2^{30}	gibibit (Gibit)			1,073,741,824 bits (128 mebibytes)
2^{31}				2,147,483,648 bits (256 mebibytes)
2^{32}				4,294,967,296 bits (512 mebibytes)
				5.45×10^{9} bits (650 mebibytes) – capacity of a regular compact disc (CD)
				5.89×10^{9} bits (702 mebibytes) – capacity of a large regular compact disc
				6.4×10^{9} bits – capacity of the human genome (assuming 2 bits for each base pair)
				6,710,886,400 bits – average size of a movie in Divx format in 2002.
			gigabyte (GB)	8,000,000,000 bits (1,000 megabytes) – In 1995 a 1 GB harddisk cost US$849, equivalent to $1,794 in 2025.
2^{33}	gibibyte (GiB)			8,589,934,592 bits (1,024 mebibytes) – The maximum disk capacity using the 21-bit LBA SCSI standard introduced in 1979.
		10^{10}		10,000,000,000 bits
2^{34}				17,179,869,184 bits (2 gibibytes). The storage limit of IDE standard for harddisks in 1986, also the volume size limit for the FAT16B file system (with 32 KiB clusters) released in 1987 as well as the maximum file size (2 GiB-1) in MS-DOS operating systems prior to the introduction of large file support in MS-DOS 7.10 (1997).
2^{35}				34,359,738,368 bits (4 gibibytes) – maximum addressable memory for the Motorola 68020 (1984) and Intel 80386 (1985), also the volume size limit for the FAT16B file system (with 64 KiB clusters) as well as the maximum file size (4 GiB-1) in MS-DOS 7.1-8.0.
				3.76×10^{10} bits (4.7 gigabytes) – capacity of a single-layer, single-sided DVD
2^{36}				68,719,476,736 bits (8 gibibytes)
				79,215,880,888 bits – 9.2 GiB size of Wikipedia article text compressed with bzip2 on 2013-06-05
		10^{11}		100,000,000,000 bits
2^{37}				137,438,953,472 bits (16 gibibytes).
				1.46×10^{11} bits (17 gigabytes) – capacity of a double-sided, dual-layered DVD
				2.15×10^{11} bits (25 gigabytes) – capacity of a single-sided, single-layered 12-cm Blu-ray
2^{38}				274,877,906,944 bits (32 gibibytes)
2^{39}				549,755,813,888 bits (64 gibibytes)
		10^{12}	terabit (Tbit)	1,000,000,000,000 bits
2^{40}	tebibit (Tibit)			1,099,511,627,776 bits (128 gibibytes) – estimated capacity of the Polychaos dubium genome, the largest known genome. The storage limit for ATA-1 compliant disks introduced in 1994.
				1.6×10^{12} bits (200 gigabytes) – capacity of a hard disk that would be considered average as of 2008. In 2005 a 200 GB harddisk cost US$100, equivalent to $165 in 2025. As of April 2015, this is the maximum capacity of a fingernail-sized microSD card.
2^{41}				2,199,023,255,552 bits (256 gibibytes) – As of 2017, this is the maximum capacity of a fingernail-sized microSD card
2^{42}				4,398,046,511,104 bits (512 gibibytes)
			terabyte (TB)	8,000,000,000,000 bits (1,000 gigabytes) – In 2010 a 1 TB hard disk cost US$80, equivalent to $118 in 2025.
2^{43}	tebibyte (TiB)			8,796,093,022,208 bits (1,024 gibibytes)
		10^{13}		10,000,000,000,000 bits (1.25 terabytes) – capacity of a human being's functional memory, according to Raymond Kurzweil in The Singularity Is Near, p. 126
				16,435,678,019,584 bits (1.9 terabytes) – Size of all multimedia files used in the English Wikipedia in May 2012
2^{44}				17,592,186,044,416 bits (2 tebibytes) – Maximum size of MBR partitions used in PCs introduced in 1983, also the maximum disk capacity using the 32-bit LBA SCSI introduced in 1987
2^{45}				35,184,372,088,832 bits (4 tebibytes)
2^{46}				70,368,744,177,664 bits (8 tebibytes)
		10^{14}		100,000,000,000,000 bits
2^{47}				140,737,488,355,328 bits (16 tebibytes). NTFS volume capacity in Windows 7, Windows Server 2008 R2 or earlier implementation.
				1.5×10^{14} bits (18.75 terabytes)
2^{48}				281,474,976,710,656 bits (32 tebibytes)
2^{48}				(approximately) 4×10^{14} bits – as of 2022, data of π to the largest number of decimal digits ever calculated (1×10^{14}).
2^{49}				562,949,953,421,312 bits (64 tebibytes)
		10^{15}	petabit (Pbit)	1,000,000,000,000,000 bits
2^{50}	pebibit (Pibit)			1,125,899,906,842,624 bits (128 tebibytes)
2^{51}				2,251,799,813,685,248 bits (256 tebibytes)
2^{52}				4,503,599,627,370,496 bits (512 tebibytes)
			petabyte (PB)	8,000,000,000,000,000 bits (1,000 terabytes)
2^{53}	pebibyte (PiB)		petabyte (PB)	9,007,199,254,740,992 bits (1,024 tebibytes)
	pebibyte (PiB)	10^{16}	petabyte (PB)	10,000,000,000,000,000 bits
2^{54}	pebibyte (PiB)	10^{16}	petabyte (PB)	18,014,398,509,481,984 bits (2 pebibytes)
2^{55}	pebibyte (PiB)	10^{16}	petabyte (PB)	36,028,797,018,963,968 bits (4 pebibytes) – theoretical maximum of addressable physical memory in the AMD64 architecture
	pebibyte (PiB)	10^{16}	petabyte (PB)	4.5×10^{16} bits (5.625 petabytes) – estimated hard drive space in Google's server farm as of 2004
2^{56}	pebibyte (PiB)	10^{16}	petabyte (PB)	72,057,594,037,927,936 bits (8 pebibytes)
2^{56}	pebibyte (PiB)	10^{16}	petabyte (PB)	10 petabytes (10^{16} bytes) – estimated approximate size of the Library of Congress's collection, including non-book materials, as of 2005. Size of the Internet Archive topped 10 PB in October 2013
2^{56}	pebibyte (PiB)	10^{16}	petabyte (PB)	10.31 petabytes – total amount of printed material published in China in 2016
2^{56}	pebibyte (PiB)	10^{17}	petabyte (PB)	100,000,000,000,000,000 bits
2^{57}	pebibyte (PiB)		petabyte (PB)	144,115,188,075,855,872 bits (16 pebibytes)
	pebibyte (PiB)		petabyte (PB)	2×10^{17} bits (25 petabytes) – Storage space of Megaupload file-hosting service at the time it was shut down in 2012
2^{58}	pebibyte (PiB)		petabyte (PB)	288,230,376,151,711,744 bits (32 pebibytes)
2^{59}	pebibyte (PiB)		petabyte (PB)	576,460,752,303,423,488 bits (64 pebibytes)
	pebibyte (PiB)		petabyte (PB)	8 ×10^{17}, the storage capacity of the fictional Star Trek character Data
	pebibyte (PiB)	10^{18}	exabit (Ebit)	1,000,000,000,000,000,000 bits
2^{60}	exbibit (Eibit)			1,152,921,504,606,846,976 bits (128 pebibytes). The storage limit using the 48-bit LBA ATA-6 standard introduced in 2002.
				2×10^{18} bits (250 petabytes) – storage space at Facebook data warehouse as of June 2013, growing at a rate of 15 PB/month.
2^{61}				2,305,843,009,213,693,952 bits (256 pebibytes)
				2.4×10^{18} bits (300 petabytes) – storage space at Facebook data warehouse as of April 2014, growing at a rate of 0.6 PB/day.
2^{62}				4,611,686,018,427,387,904 bits (512 pebibytes)
			exabyte (EB)	8,000,000,000,000,000,000 bits (1,000 petabytes)
2^{63}	exbibyte (EiB)			9,223,372,036,854,775,808 bits (1,024 pebibytes)
		10^{19}		10,000,000,000,000,000,000 bits
2^{64}				18,446,744,073,709,551,616 bits (2 exbibytes).
2^{65}				36,893,488,147,419,103,232 bits (4 exbibytes)
				50,000,000,000,000,000,000 bits (50 exabit)
2^{66}				73,786,976,294,838,206,464 bits (8 exbibytes)
		10^{20}		100,000,000,000,000,000,000 bits
				1.2×10^{20} bits (15 exabytes) – estimated storage space at Google data warehouse as of 2013
2^{67}				147,573,952,589,676,412,928 bits (16 exbibytes) – maximum addressable memory using 64-bit addresses without segmentation. Maximum file size for ZFS filesystem.
2^{68}				295,147,905,179,352,825,856 bits (32 exbibytes)
				3.5 × 10^{20} bits – increase in information capacity when 1 joule of energy is added to a heat-bath at 300 K (27 °C)
2^{69}				590,295,810,358,705,651,712 bits (64 exbibytes)
		10^{21}	zettabit (Zbit)	1,000,000,000,000,000,000,000 bits
2^{70}	zebibit (Zibit)			1,180,591,620,717,411,303,424 bits (128 exbibytes)
2^{71}				2,361,183,241,434,822,606,848 bits (256 exbibytes)
				3.4×10^{21} bits (0.36 zettabytes) – amount of information that can be stored in 1 gram of DNA
				4.7×10^{21} bits (0.50 zettabytes) – amount of digitally stored information in the world as of May 2009
				4.8×10^{21} bits (0.61 zettabytes) – total hard drive capacity shipped in 2016
2^{72}				4,722,366,482,869,645,213,696 bits (512 exbibytes)
			zettabyte (ZB)	8,000,000,000,000,000,000,000 bits (1,000 exabytes)
2^{73}	zebibyte (ZiB)			9,444,732,965,739,290,427,392 bits (1,024 exbibytes)
		10^{22}		10,000,000,000,000,000,000,000 bits
2^{76}				2^{76} bits – Maximum volume and file size in the Unix File System (UFS) and maximum disk capacity using the 64-bit LBA SCSI standard introduced in 2000 using 512-byte blocks.
		10^{23}		1.0×10^{23} bits – increase in information capacity when 1 joule of energy is added to a heat-bath at 1 K (−272.15 °C)
2^{77}				6.0×10^{23} bits – information content of 1 mole (12.01 g) of graphite at 25 °C; equivalent to an average of 0.996 bits per atom.
		10^{24}	yottabit (Ybit)	1,000,000,000,000,000,000,000,000 bits
				7.3×10^{24} bits – information content of 1 mole (18.02 g) of liquid water at 25 °C; equivalent to an average of 12.14 bits per molecule.
2^{80}	yobibit (Yibit)			1,208,925,819,614,629,174,706,176 bits (128 zebibytes)
			yottabyte (YB)	8,000,000,000,000,000,000,000,000 bits (1,000 zettabytes)
2^{83}	yobibyte (YiB)			9,671,406,556,917,033,397,649,408 bits (1,024 zebibytes)
		10^{25}		1.1×10^{25} bits – entropy increase of 1 mole (18.02 g) of water, on vaporizing at 100 °C at standard pressure; equivalent to an average of 18.90 bits per molecule.
				1.5×10^{25} bits – information content of 1 mole (20.18 g) of neon gas at 25 °C and 1 atm; equivalent to an average of 25.39 bits per atom.
2^{86}		10^{26}		
2^{89}		10^{27}	ronnabit (Rbit)	
2^{93}		10^{27}	ronnabyte (RB)	
2^{100}		10^{30}	quettabit (Qbit)	
2^{102}		10^{30}	quettabyte (QB)	
Beyond standardized SI / IEC (binary) prefixes
2^{127}	N/A	10^{38}	N/A	2^{127} bits, 2^{124} bytes – IBM Eagle
2^{131}	N/A	10^{39}	N/A	2^{131} bits, 2^{128} bytes – theoretical maximum volume size of the ZFS filesystem.
2^{150}	N/A	10^{42}	N/A	~ 10^{42} bits – the number of bits required to perfectly recreate the natural matter of the average-sized U.S. adult male human brain down to the quantum level on a computer is about 2.6×10^{42} bits of information (see Bekenstein bound for the basis for this calculation).
2^{193}	N/A	10^{58}	N/A	~ 10^{58} bits – thermodynamic entropy of the sun (about 30 bits per proton, plus 10 bits per electron).
2^{230}	N/A	10^{69}	N/A	~ 10^{69} bits – thermodynamic entropy of the Milky Way Galaxy (counting only the stars, not the black holes within the galaxy)
2^{255}	N/A	10^{77}	N/A	1.5×10^{77} bits – information content of a one-solar-mass black hole.
2^{305}	N/A	10^{90}	N/A	The information capacity of the observable universe, according to Seth Lloyd (not including gravitation)

== See also ==
- Data-rate units
- List of interface bit rates
- Orders of magnitude (entropy)
- Unit prefix#Unofficial prefixes
