= Optical force =

Can light move objects? Answer- yes

The optical force is a phenomenon whereby beams of light can attract and repel each other. The force acts along an axis which is perpendicular to the light beams. Because of this, parallel beams can be induced to converge or diverge. The optical force works on a microscopic scale, and cannot currently be detected at larger scales. It was discovered by a team of Yale researchers led by electrical engineer Hong Tang.

== See also ==
- Optical lift
