= Orders of magnitude (entropy) =

Comparison of a wide range of entropies

The following list shows different orders of magnitude of entropy.

Factor (J⋅K^{−1})	Value	Item
10^{−24}	9.5699×10^{−24} J⋅K^{−1}	Entropy equivalent of one bit of information, equal to k times ln(2)
10^{−23}	1.381×10^{−23} J⋅K^{−1}	Boltzmann constant, entropy equivalent of one nat of information.
10^{−21}	2.15879432×10^{−21} J⋅K^{−1}	Perfectly shuffled stanrad deck of cards, equal to k times ln(52!)
10^{−16}	1.1×10^{−16} J⋅K^{−1}	Amount of information stored during language acquisition
10^{1}	5.74 J⋅K^{−1}	Standard entropy of 1 mole of graphite
10^{33}	≈ 10^{35} J⋅K^{−1}	Entropy of the Sun (given as ≈ 10^{42} erg⋅K^{−1} in Bekenstein (1973))
10^{54}	1.5×10^{54} J⋅K^{−1}	Entropy of a black hole of one solar mass (given as ≈ 10^{60} erg⋅K^{−1} in Bekenstein (1973))
10^{81}	4.3×10^{81} J⋅K^{−1}	One estimate of the theoretical maximum entropy of the universe

== See also ==
- Heat capacity
- Joule per kelvin
- Orders of magnitude (data), relates to information entropy
- Order of magnitude (terminology)
