= Orders of magnitude (specific heat capacity) =

Comparison of a wide range of specific heat capacities

This is a table of specific heat capacities by magnitude. Unless otherwise noted, these values assume standard ambient temperature and pressure.

List of orders of magnitude for specific heat capacity
| SI prefix | Factor | Value J·kg^{−1}·K^{−1} | Item |
|---|---|---|---|
| Deca- | 10^{1} | 94 | Radon |
| Hecto- | 10^{2} | 120 | Uranium |
| Hecto- | 10^{2} | 129 | Gold |
| Hecto- | 10^{2} | 130 | Iridium |
| Hecto- | 10^{2} | 130 | Osmium |
| Hecto- | 10^{2} | 139 | Mercury |
| Hecto- | 10^{2} | 145 | Iodine |
| Hecto- | 10^{2} | 158 | Xenon |
| Hecto- | 10^{2} | 240 | Caesium |
| Hecto- | 10^{2} | 246 | Ethanol |
| Hecto- | 10^{2} | 248 | Krypton |
| Hecto- | 10^{2} | 363 | Rubidium |
| Hecto- | 10^{2} | 377.48 | Brass |
| Hecto- | 10^{2} | 385 | Copper |
| Hecto- | 10^{2} | 420 | Cobalt |
| Hecto- | 10^{2} | 444 | Iron |
| Hecto- | 10^{2} | 480 | Bromine |
| Hecto- | 10^{2} | 480 | Chlorine |
| Hecto- | 10^{2} | 502 | Diamond |
| Hecto- | 10^{2} | 520 | Argon |
| Hecto- | 10^{2} | 677 | Glass |
| Hecto- | 10^{2} | 720 | Graphite |
| Hecto- | 10^{2} | 757 | Potassium |
| Hecto- | 10^{2} | 824 | Fluorine |
| Hecto- | 10^{2} | 900 | Aluminium |
| Kilo- | 10^{3} | 1030 | Neon |
| Kilo- | 10^{3} | 1230 | Sodium |
| Kilo- | 10^{3} | 1660 | Pentane |
| Kilo- | 10^{3} | ≈ 2000 | Oil |
| Kilo- | 10^{3} | 2060 | Ice (0 °C) |
| Kilo- | 10^{3} | 2100 | Coconut oil |
| Kilo- | 10^{3} | 3582 | Lithium |
| Kilo- | 10^{3} | 4186 | Water |
| Kilo- | 10^{3} | 4219 | Heavy water |
| Kilo- | 10^{3} | 4700 | Ammonia (liquid) |
| Kilo- | 10^{3} | 5193 | Helium |
| Kilo- | 10^{4} | 14304 | Hydrogen |
