= Optics Classification and Indexing Scheme =

Optics Classification and Indexing Scheme (OCIS) is a categorization scheme used to encode the topic of an article or presentation in a 7-digit code. The system is used by the Optical Society of America in the organization of conferences and for journal publications. Authors are required to choose one or several OCIS numbers at submission.
