= Orders of magnitude (charge) =

Comparison of a wide range of electric charges

This article is a progressive and labeled list of the SI electric charge orders of magnitude, with certain examples appended to some list objects.

List of orders of magnitude for electric charge
Factor [Coulomb]	SI prefix	Value	Item
10^{−21}	zepto- (zC)		
10^{−20}		−5.34×10^{−20} C	(−1/3 e) – Charge of down, strange and bottom quarks
10^{−19}		1.068×10^{−19} C	(2/3 e)—Charge of up, charm and top quarks
10^{−19}		1.602×10^{−19} C	The elementary charge e, i.e. the negative charge on a single electron or the positive charge on a single proton
10^{−18}	atto- (aC)	~1.8755×10^{−18} C	($e/\sqrt{\alpha}$, $\alpha$ being the fine-structure constant)—Planck charge
10^{−17}		1.473×10^{−17} C	(92 e) – Charge on a uranium nucleus (= 92 x 1.602×10^{−19} C)
10^{−16}		1.344×10^{−16} C	Charge on a dust particle in a plasma
10^{−15}	femto- (fC)	1×10^{−15} C	Charge on a typical dust particle
10^{−12}	pico- (pC)	1×10^{−12} C	Charge in typical microwave frequency capacitors
10^{−9}	nano- (nC)	1×10^{−9} C	Charge in typical radio frequency capacitors
10^{−6}	micro- (μC)	1×10^{−6} C	Charge in typical audio frequency capacitors
10^{−6}	micro- (μC)	~ 1×10^{−6} C	Static electricity from rubbing materials together
10^{−3}	milli- (mC)	1×10^{−3} C	Charge in typical power supply capacitors
10^{−3}	milli- (mC)	2.1×10^{−3} C	Charge in CH85-2100-105 high voltage capacitor for microwaves
10^{0}	C	1×10^{0} C	Two like charges, each of 1 C, placed one meter apart, would experience a repulsive force of approximately 9×10^{9} N
10^{0}	C	3.16×10^{0} C	Supercapacitor for real-time clock (RTC) (1F x 3.6V)
10^{1}	deca- (daC)	2.6×10^{1} C	Charge in a typical thundercloud (15–350 C)
10^{3}	kilo- (kC)	5×10^{3} C	Typical alkaline AA battery is about 5000 C ≈ 1.4 A⋅h
10^{4}		~9.65×10^{4} C	Charge on one mole of electrons (Faraday constant)
10^{5}		1.8×10^{5} C	Automotive battery charge. 50Ah = 1.8×10^{5} C
10^{6}	mega- (MC)	10.72×10^{6} C	Charge needed to produce 1 kg of aluminium from bauxite in an electrolytic cell
10^{7}			
10^{8}		5.9×10^{8} C	Charge in world's largest battery bank (36 MWh), assuming 220 VAC output
10^{15}		1×10^{15} C	The rotation of a black hole in magnetic field generates electric field due to the twisting of magnetic field lines. This electric field can be associated with induced charge (upper limit)
