= Optical microsphere =

Optical microspheres (photonic atoms) are one of the types of optical microresonators (also microcavities) employed commonly in photonic research; they provide high quality factor up to 10^{11}. These optical resonators are used for active and passive photonic applications such as microlaser cavities and filters among many experiments that take advantage of very high levels of light confined on a small structure.
