= Orders of magnitude (radiation) =

Comparison of a wide range of radiation dosages

== Radiation Dosages ==
Although the International System of Units (SI) defines the Sievert (Sv) as the unit of equivalent dose, chronic radiation levels and standards are still often given in units of Millirems (mRem), where 1 mRem equals 1/1,000 of a Rem and 1 rem equals 0.01 Sv. Light radiation sickness begins at about 50–100 Rad (0.5–1 Gray (Gy), 0.5–1 Sv, 50–100 Rem, 50,000–100,000 mRem).

=== Absorbed Dosages (D) ===
==== Total Absorbed Dosages ====
Total Absorbed Dosage Levels (D)
Dosage Level	Description
250 mGy	Lowest dose to cause clinically observable blood changes
260 mGy	Peak natural background dose after one year in Ramsar, Iran
2 Gy	Local dose for onset of erythema in humans
2.5 Gy	This dose is lethal to 1% of humans (LD1).
5 Gy	This dose is lethal to 50% of humans (LD50).
8 Gy	This dose is lethal to 99% of humans (LD99).
48.5 Gy (4.85 krad)	Roughly calculated from the estimated 4,500 + 350 rad dose for fatality of Russian experimenter on June 17, 1997, at Sarov.
100 Gy (10 krad)	Estimated fatality at the United Nuclear Fuels Recovery Plant on July 24, 1964.
2 kGy	One second of the estimated dose applied to the inner wall in ITER
10 kGy (1 Mrad)	Typical tolerance of radiation-hardened microchips
10 MGy (1 Grad)	The maximum radiation dosage of the most hardened electronics.

=== Effective Dosages (E) ===
The following table includes some dosages for comparison purposes, using millisieverts (mSv) (one thousandth of a sievert).

Note that 100 mSv is considered twice in the table below – once as received over a 5-year period, and once as an acute dose, received over a short period of time, with differing predicted effects. The table describes doses and their official limits, rather than effects.

Effective Dosage Levels (E)
Level (mSv)	Level in standard form (mSv)	Duration	Hourly equivalent (μSv/hour)	Description
0.001	1×10^{−3}	Hourly	1	Cosmic ray dose rate on commercial flights varies from 1 to 10 μSv/hour, depending on altitude, position and solar sunspot phase.
0.01	1×10^{−2}	Daily	0.4	Natural background radiation, including radon
0.06	6×10^{−2}	Acute	-	Chest X-ray (AP+Lat)
0.07	7×10^{−2}	Acute	-	Transatlantic airplane flight.
0.09	9×10^{−2}	Acute	-	Dental X-ray (Panoramic)
0.1	1×10^{−1}	Annual	0.011	Average USA dose from consumer products
0.15	1.5×10^{−1}	Annual	0.017	USA EPA cleanup standard
0.25	2.5×10^{−1}	Annual	0.028	USA NRC cleanup standard for individual sites/sources
0.27	2.7×10^{−1}	Annual	0.031	Yearly dose from natural cosmic radiation at sea level (0.5 in Denver due to altitude)
0.28	2.8×10^{−1}	Annual	0.032	USA yearly dose from natural terrestrial radiation (0.16-0.63 depending on soil composition)
0.46	4.6×10^{−1}	Acute	-	Estimated largest off-site dose possible from March 28, 1979 Three Mile Island accident
0.48	4.8×10^{−1}	Day	20	USA NRC public area exposure limit
0.66	6.6×10^{−1}	Annual	0.075	Average USA dose from human-made sources
0.7	7×10^{−1}	Acute	-	Mammogram
1	1×10^{0}	Annual	0.11	Limit of dose from man-made sources to a member of the public who is not a radiation worker in the US and Canada
1.1	1.1×10^{0}	Annual	0.13	Average USA radiation worker occupational dose in 1980
1.2	1.2×10^{0}	Acute	-	Abdominal X-ray
2	2×10^{0}	Annual	0.23	USA average medical and natural background Human internal radiation due to radon, varies with radon levels
2	2×10^{0}	Acute	-	Head CT
3	3×10^{0}	Annual	0.34	USA average dose from all natural sources
3.66	3.66×10^{0}	Annual	0.42	USA average from all sources, including medical diagnostic radiation doses
4	4×10^{0}	Duration of the pregnancy	0.6	Canada CNSC maximum occupational dose to a pregnant woman who is a designated Nuclear Energy Worker.
5	5×10^{0}	Annual	0.57	USA NRC occupational limit for minors (10% of adult limit); USA NRC limit for visitors
5	5×10^{0}	Pregnancy	0.77	USA NRC occupational limit for pregnant women
6.4	6.4×10^{0}	Annual	0.73	High Background Radiation Area (HBRA) of Yangjiang, China
7.6	7.6×10^{0}	Annual	0.87	Fountainhead Rock Place, Santa Fe, NM natural
8	8×10^{0}	Acute	-	Chest CT
10	1×10^{1}	Acute	-	Lower dose level for public calculated from the 1 to 5 rem range for which USA EPA guidelines mandate emergency action when resulting from a nuclear accident Abdominal CT
14	1.4×10^{1}	Acute	-	^{18}F FDG PET scan, Whole Body
50	5×10^{1}	Annual	5.7	USA NRC/ Canada CNSC occupational limit for designated Nuclear Energy Workers
100	1×10^{2}	5 years	2.3	Canada CNSC occupational limit over a 5-year dosimetry period for designated Nuclear Energy Workers
100	1×10^{2}	Acute	-	USA EPA acute dose level estimated to increase cancer risk 0.8%
120	1.2×10^{2}	30 years	0.46	Exposure, long duration, Ural Mountains, lower limit, lower cancer mortality rate
150	1.5×10^{2}	Annual	17	USA NRC occupational eye lens exposure limit
170	1.7×10^{2}	Acute		Average dose for 187,000 Chernobyl recovery operation workers in 1986
175	1.75×10^{2}	Annual	20	Guarapari, Brazil natural radiation sources
250	2.5×10^{2}	2 hours	125,000	(125 mSv/hour) Whole body dose exclusion zone criteria for US nuclear reactor siting (converted from 25 rem)
250	2.5×10^{2}	Acute	-	USA EPA voluntary maximum dose for emergency non-life-saving work
400–900	4–9×10^{2}	Annual	46–103	Unshielded in interplanetary space.
500	5×10^{2}	Annual	57	USA NRC occupational whole skin, limb skin, or single organ exposure limit
500	5×10^{2}	Acute	-	Canada CNSC occupational limit for designated Nuclear Energy Workers carrying out urgent and necessary work during an emergency. Low-level radiation sickness due to short-term exposure
750	7.5×10^{2}	Acute	-	USA EPA voluntary maximum dose for emergency life-saving work
1,000	10×10^{2}	Hourly	1,000,000	Level reported during Fukushima I nuclear accidents, in immediate vicinity of reactor
3,000	3×10^{3}	Acute	-	Thyroid dose (due to iodine absorption) exclusion zone criteria for US nuclear reactor siting (converted from 300 rem)
4,800	4.8×10^{3}	Acute	-	LD_{50} (actually LD_{50/60}) in humans from radiation poisoning with medical treatment estimated from 480 to 540 rem.
5,000	5×10^{3}	Acute	-	Calculated from the estimated 510 rem dose fatally received by Harry Daghlian on August 21, 1945, at Los Alamos and lower estimate for fatality of Russian specialist on April 5, 1968, at Chelyabinsk-70.
5,000	5×10^{3}			5,000 - 10,000 mSv. Most commercial electronics can survive this radiation level.
16,000	1.6×10^{4}	Acute		Highest estimated dose to Chernobyl emergency worker diagnosed with acute radiation syndrome
20,000	2×10^{4}	Acute	2,114,536	Interplanetary exposure to solar particle event (SPE) of October 1989.
21,000	2.1×10^{4}	Acute	-	Calculated from the estimated 2,100 rem dose fatally received by Louis Slotin on May 21, 1946, at Los Alamos and lower estimate for fatality of Russian specialist on April 5, 1968 Chelyabinsk-70.
48,500	4.85×10^{4}	Acute	-	Roughly calculated from the estimated 4,500 + 350 rad dose for fatality of Russian experimenter on June 17, 1997, at Sarov.
60,000	6×10^{4}	Acute	-	Roughly calculated from the estimated 6,000 rem doses for several Russian fatalities from 1958 onwards, such as on May 26, 1971, at the Kurchatov Institute. Lower estimate for fatality of Cecil Kelley at Los Alamos on December 30, 1958.
100,000	1×10^{5}	Acute	-	Roughly calculated from the estimated 10,000 rad dose for fatality at the United Nuclear Fuels Recovery Plant on July 24, 1964.
30,000,000	3×10^{7}		3,600,000	Radiation tolerated by Thermococcus gammatolerans, a microbe extremely resistant to radiation.
70,000,000,000	7×10^{10}	Hourly	70,000,000,000,000	Estimated dose rate for the inner wall in ITER (2 kGy/s with an approximate weighting factor of 10)

Comparison of Radiation Doses - includes the amount detected on the trip from Earth to Mars by the RAD on the MSL (2011 - 2013).

== See also ==
- Mars Radiation Environment Experiment (MARIE)
