= Orders of magnitude (voltage) =

Comparison of a wide range of voltages

To help compare different orders of magnitude, the following list describes various voltage levels.

SI prefix	Factor (volt)	Value	Item
Micro-	10^{−7}	500 nV	Change in nerve cell potential caused by opening a single acetylcholine receptor channel
Micro-	10^{−6}	2 μV	Noise in an EEG taken at the scalp
Milli-	10^{−5}	10–100 μV	Peak-to-peak amplitude of an average EEG taken at the scalp
Milli-	10^{−5}	15 μV	Minimum terrestrial digital-TV RF antenna signal (−85 dBm over 75 Ω)
Milli-	10^{−5}	56 μV	Minimum terrestrial analog-TV RF antenna signal (35 dB[μV])
Milli-	10^{−4}	500–1000 μV	Miniature endplate potentials, spontaneous fluctuations in neuron potentials
Milli-	10^{−3}	1–2 mV	Potential created at ambient temperatures from K-type thermocouple
Centi-	10^{−2}	~10–50 mV	Ripple voltage in the output of a good DC power supply
Centi-	10^{−2}	75 mV	Nerve cell resting potential
Deci-	10^{−1}	320 mV	Typical voltage reference level in consumer audio electronics (0.316 V rms)
Deci-	10^{−1}	~500 mV	Typical MOSFET threshold voltage for modern processes
Deci-	10^{−1}	~700 mV	Forward voltage drop of normal silicon diodes
Deci-	10^{−1}	800–1000 mV	Typical positive supply voltage of a low voltage CMOS digital integrated circuit
Deci-	10^{−1}	900 mV	Lemon battery cell (made with copper and zinc electrodes)
N/A	10^{0}	0-3 V	Magnitudes of standard reduction potentials in chemistry
N/A	10^{0}	1.5 V	Alkaline battery AAAA, AAA, AA, C or D battery
N/A	10^{0}	3.3 V	One of the most common low voltage CMOS digital circuit supply voltages.
N/A	10^{0}	5 V	USB power, used for example to charge a cell phone or a digital camera. Also one of the most common digital circuit supply voltages for both TTL and CMOS technologies.
N/A	10^{0}	6 V	A common voltage for medium-size electric lanterns. A voltage for older electric systems of automobiles.
Deca-	10^{1}	12 V	Typical car battery
Hecto-	10^{2}	100–240 V	Domestic wall socket voltage
Hecto-	10^{2}	600 V	Electric eel sends this voltage in an average attack
Hecto-	10^{2}	630 V	London Underground railway tracks
Kilo-	10^{3}	2450 V	Electric chair execution in Nebraska
Kilo-	10^{3}	3–10 kV	Electric fence
Kilo-	10^{3}	3 kV	Voltage required to generate every 1 mm of electric arc
Kilo-	10^{3}	3–35 kV	Accelerating voltage for a typical television cathode ray tube
Kilo-	10^{3}	4160-34,500 V	Typical voltages in North America for distribution of power from distribution substations to end users
Kilo-	10^{4}	15 kV	Train 15 kV AC railway electrification overhead lines, 16 2/3 Hz
Kilo-	10^{4}	25 kV	European high-speed train overhead power lines
Kilo-	10^{4}	33 kV	Maximum voltage allowed in an electricity distribution grid after 1919 in the UK until 1926 (still used for heavy industry and factory overhead cable distribution systems)
Kilo-	10^{4}	69–230 kV	Range used in North American power high-voltage transmission substations
Kilo-	10^{5}	345–800 kV	Range used in extra-high voltage power transmission systems
Kilo-	10^{5}	800 kV	Lowest voltage used by ultra-high voltage (UHV) power transmission systems
Mega-	10^{6}	3 MV	Used by the ultra-high voltage electron microscope at Osaka University
Mega-	10^{7}	25.5 MV	The largest man-made DC voltage – produced in a Van de Graaff generator at Oak Ridge National Laboratory
Mega-	10^{8}	100 MV	The potential difference between the ends of a typical lightning bolt
Peta-	10^{15}	7 PV	Voltage around a particular energetic highly magnetized rotating neutron star
Ronna-	10^{27}	1.04 RV	Planck voltage

== SI multiples ==
SI multiples of volt (V)
Submultiples			Multiples		
Value	SI symbol	Name	Value	SI symbol	Name
10^{−1} V	dV	decivolt	10^{1} V	daV	decavolt
10^{−2} V	cV	centivolt	10^{2} V	hV	hectovolt
10^{−3} V	mV	millivolt	10^{3} V	kV	kilovolt
10^{−6} V	μV	microvolt	10^{6} V	MV	megavolt
10^{−9} V	nV	nanovolt	10^{9} V	GV	gigavolt
10^{−12} V	pV	picovolt	10^{12} V	TV	teravolt
10^{−15} V	fV	femtovolt	10^{15} V	PV	petavolt
10^{−18} V	aV	attovolt	10^{18} V	EV	exavolt
10^{−21} V	zV	zeptovolt	10^{21} V	ZV	zettavolt
10^{−24} V	yV	yoctovolt	10^{24} V	YV	yottavolt
10^{−27} V	rV	rontovolt	10^{27} V	RV	ronnavolt
10^{−30} V	qV	quectovolt	10^{30} V	QV	quettavolt
